= List of World War II weapons of the United Kingdom =

== Small arms ==
=== Rifles ===
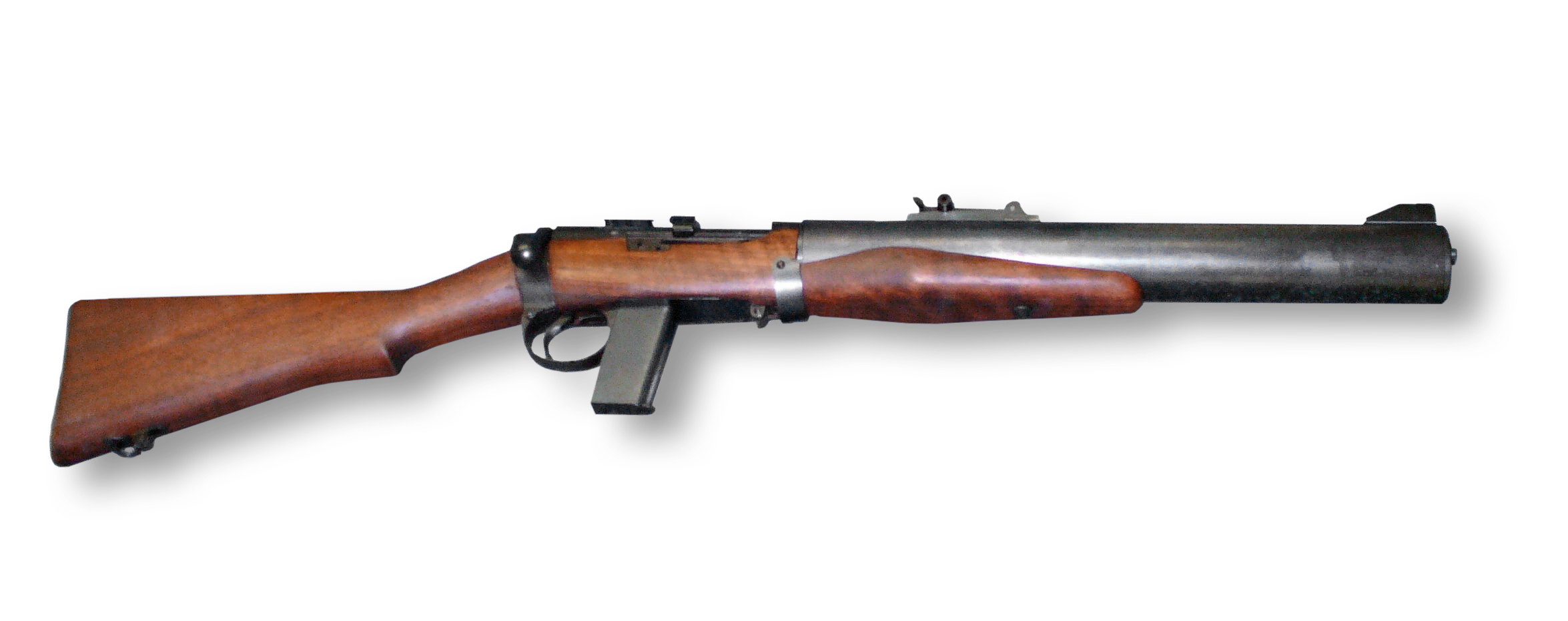

- De Lisle carbine – "silenced" design firing subsonic pistol ammunition. Specialist issue, 129 made.

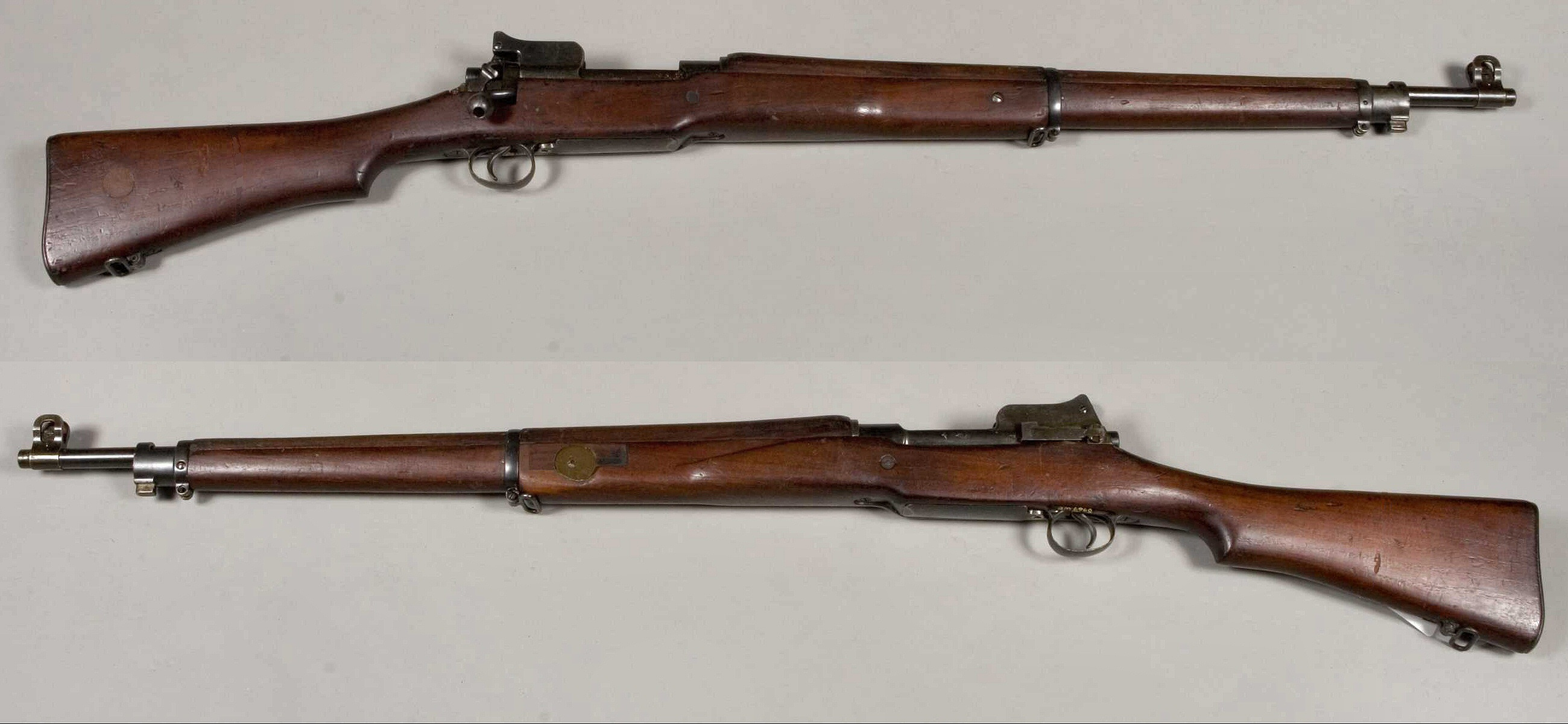

- Enfield Pattern 14 (P14) – Used as a marksman weapon until the No.4 Mk. I (T) was introduced, also issued in large number to the British Home Guard. Known as "Rifle No. 3.

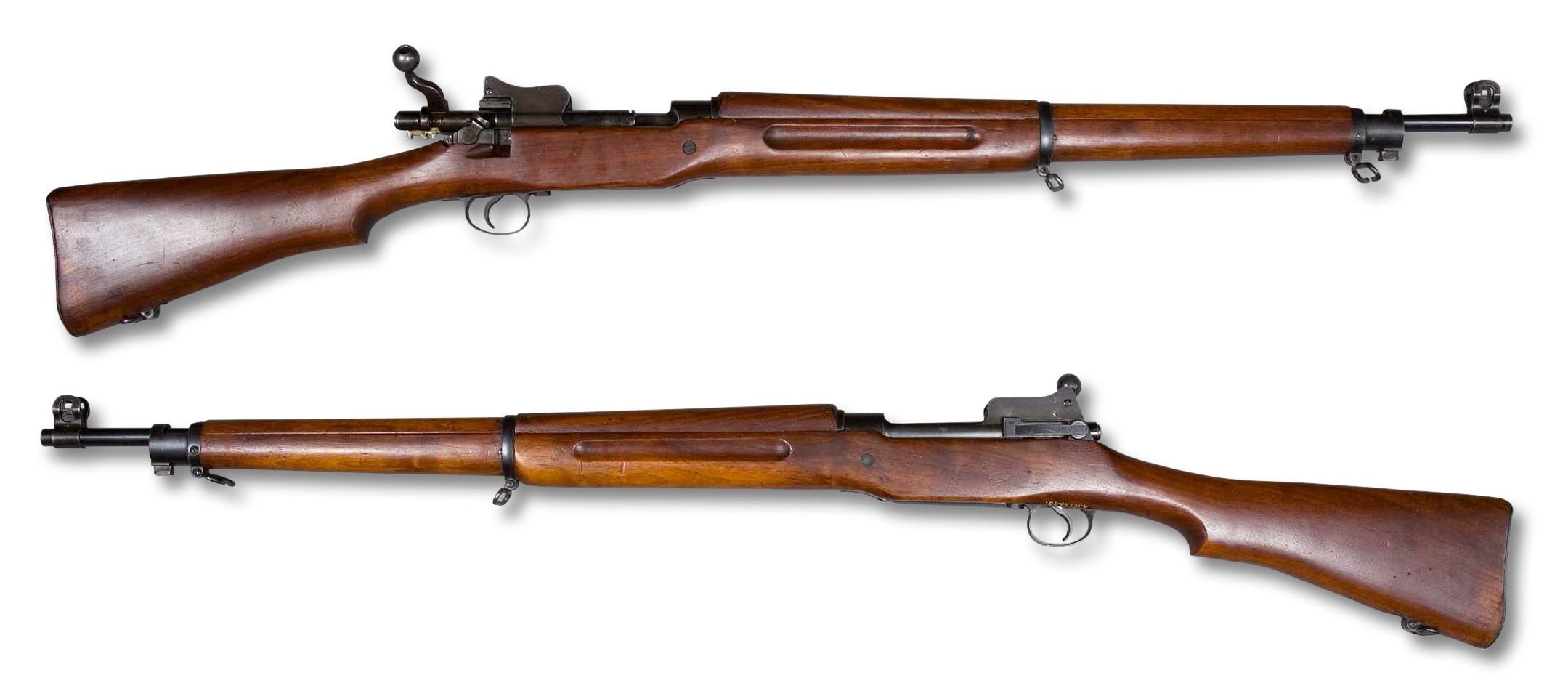

- M1917 Enfield – Used 30-06 ammunition. Issued to British Home Guard.
- Lee Enfield No.1 Mk.III* – Lee Enfield rifle in service at the beginning of the war, supplemented and replaced by the No.4 Mk.I by mid-war.

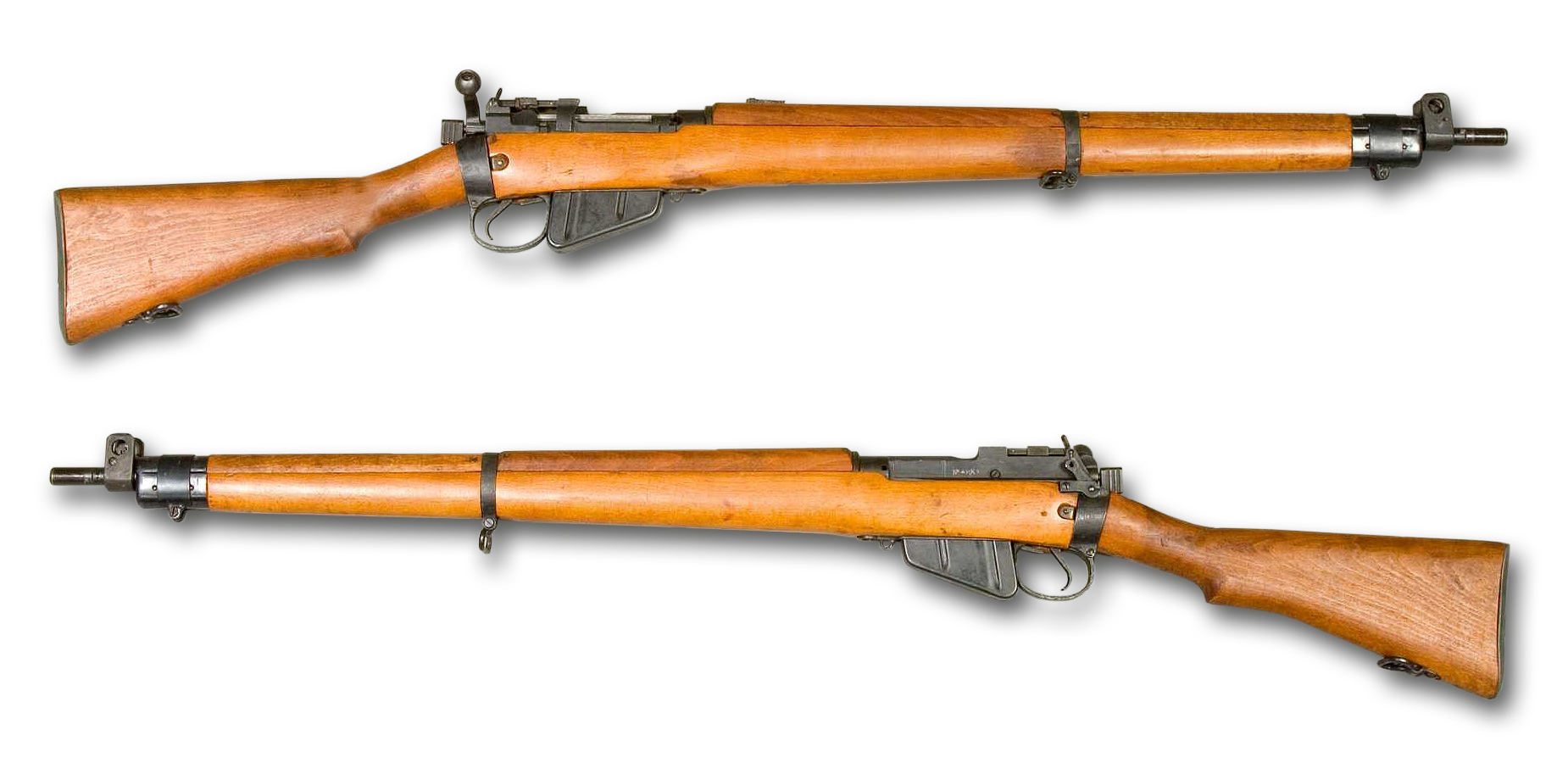

- Rifle, No.4 Mk.1 and No.4 Mk.I (T) – Lee Enfield rifle that replaced the No.I Mk.III* in larger numbers mid-war.

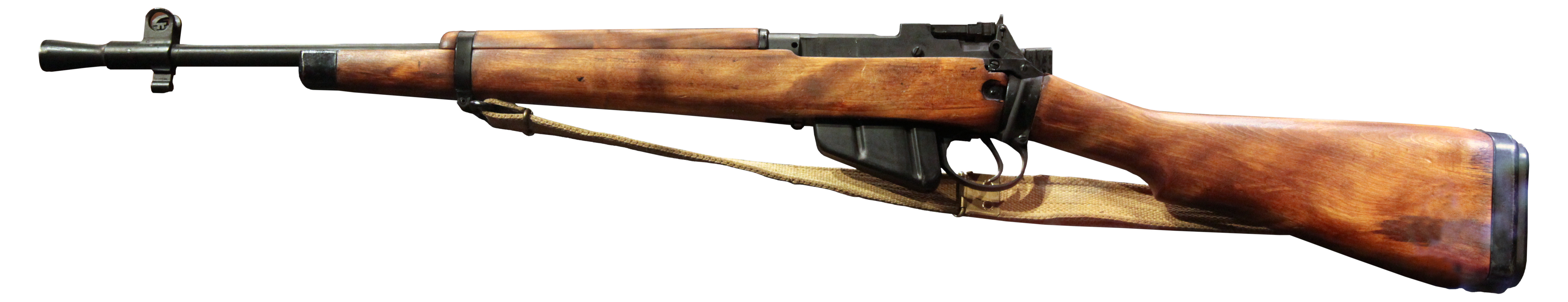

- Lee–Enfield No. 5 Mk. I "jungle carbine" – shorter, lighter development of the Lee-Enfield. Introduced in 1944 to replace the No.1 Mk.III* for service in the jungle.

=== Submachine guns ===
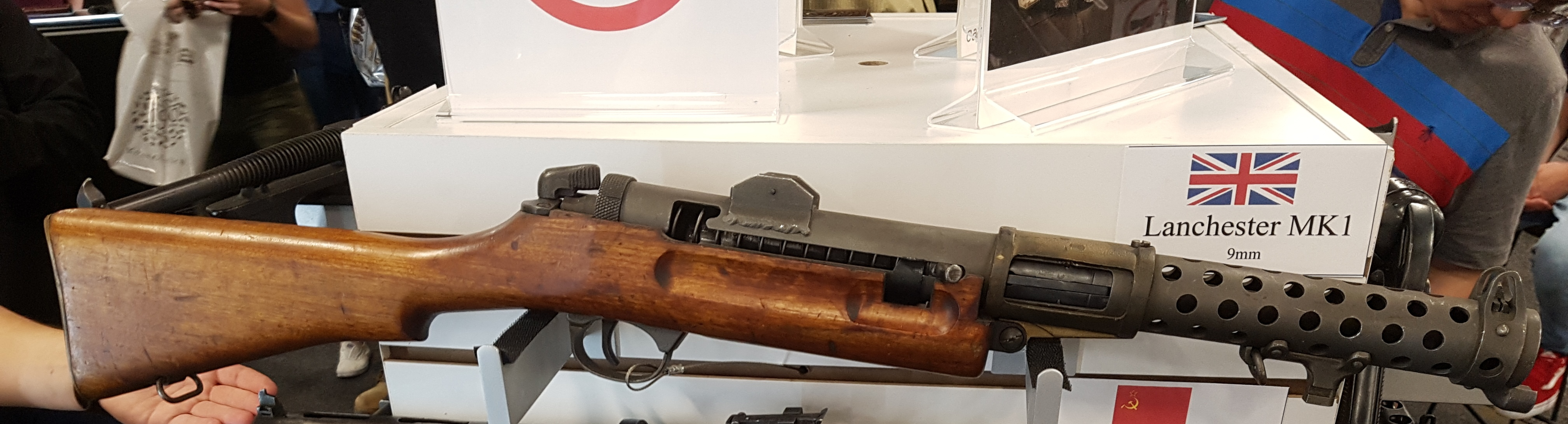

- Lanchester submachine gun – British submachine gun, developed from the German MP28, used by the Royal Navy and the Royal Air Force.

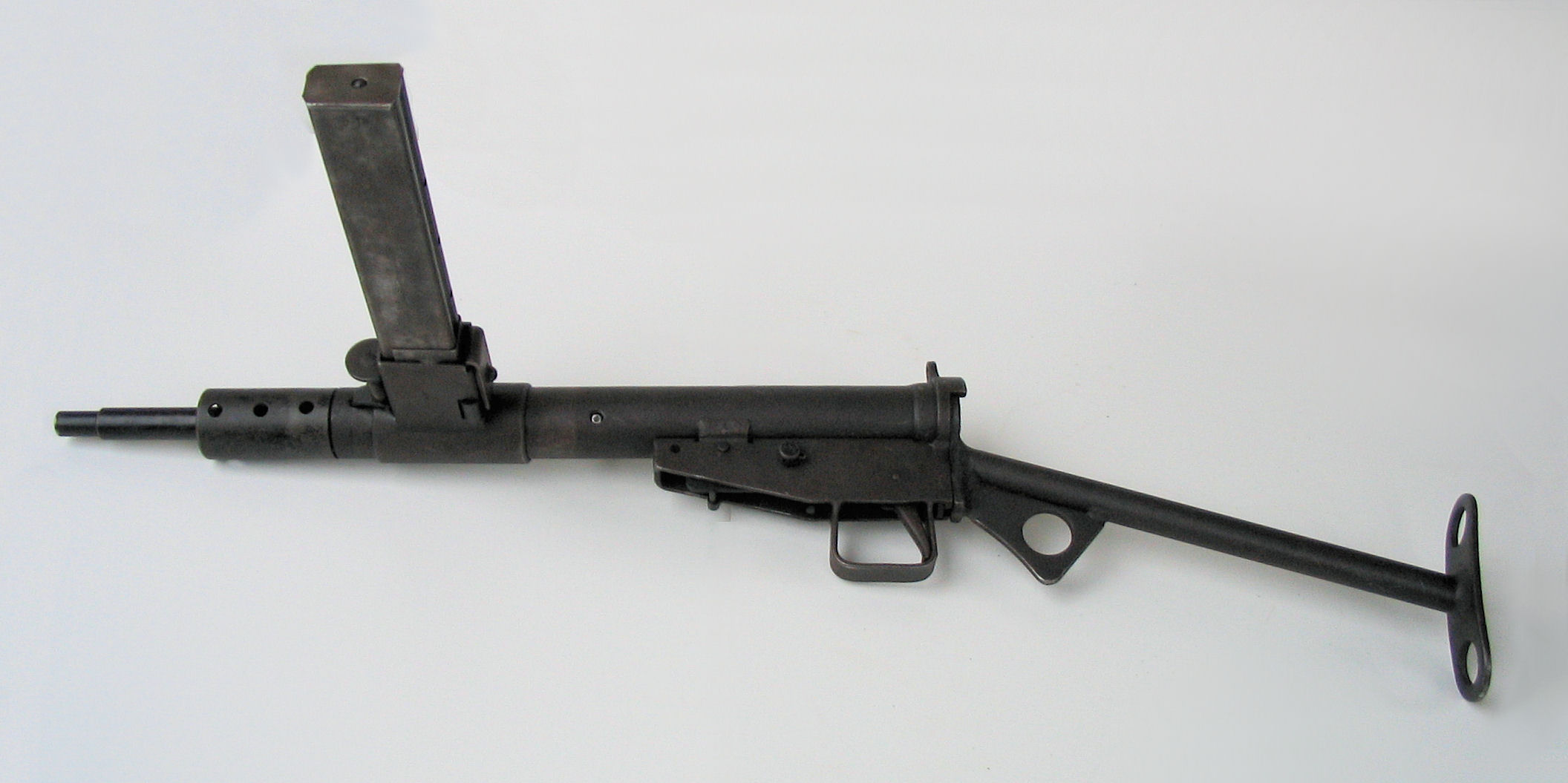

- Sten – simple design, low-cost British submachine gun in service from late 1941 to the end of the war. Around four million produced.

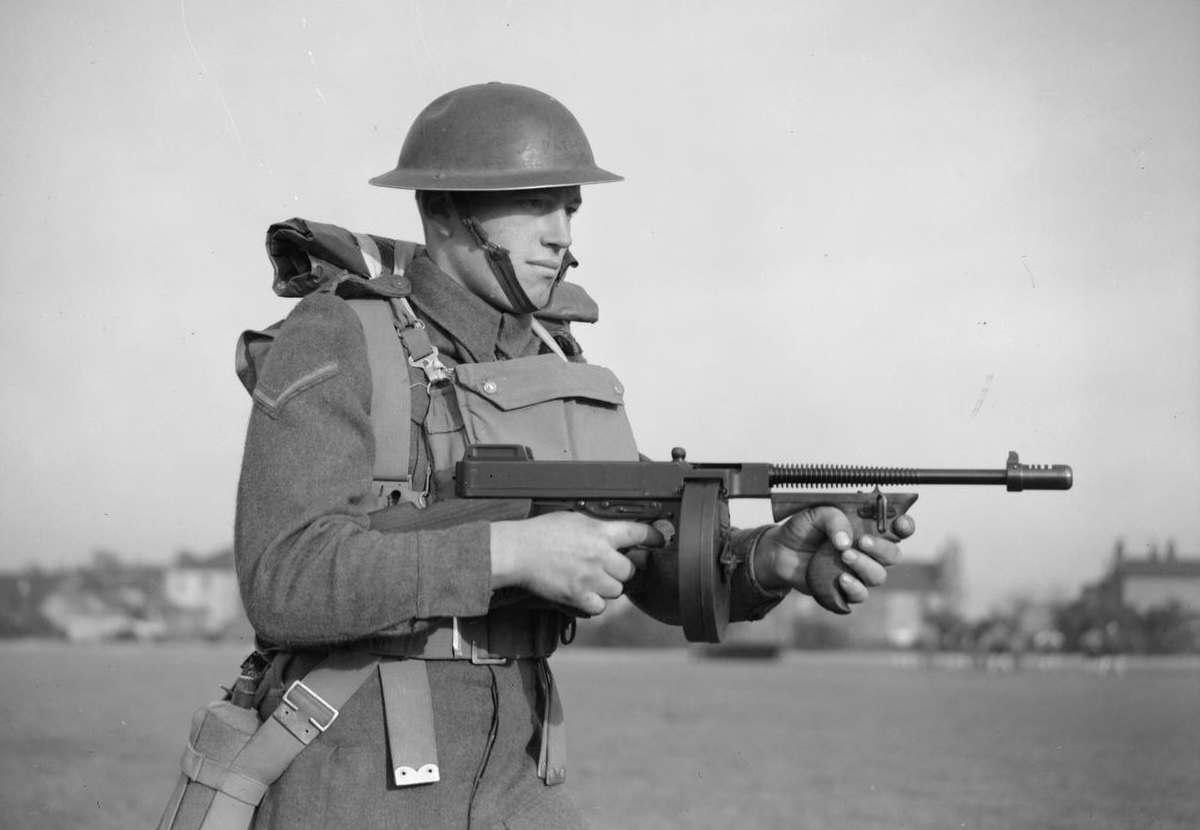

- Thompson submachine gun – American submachine gun used in large numbers until the Sten gun was introduced.

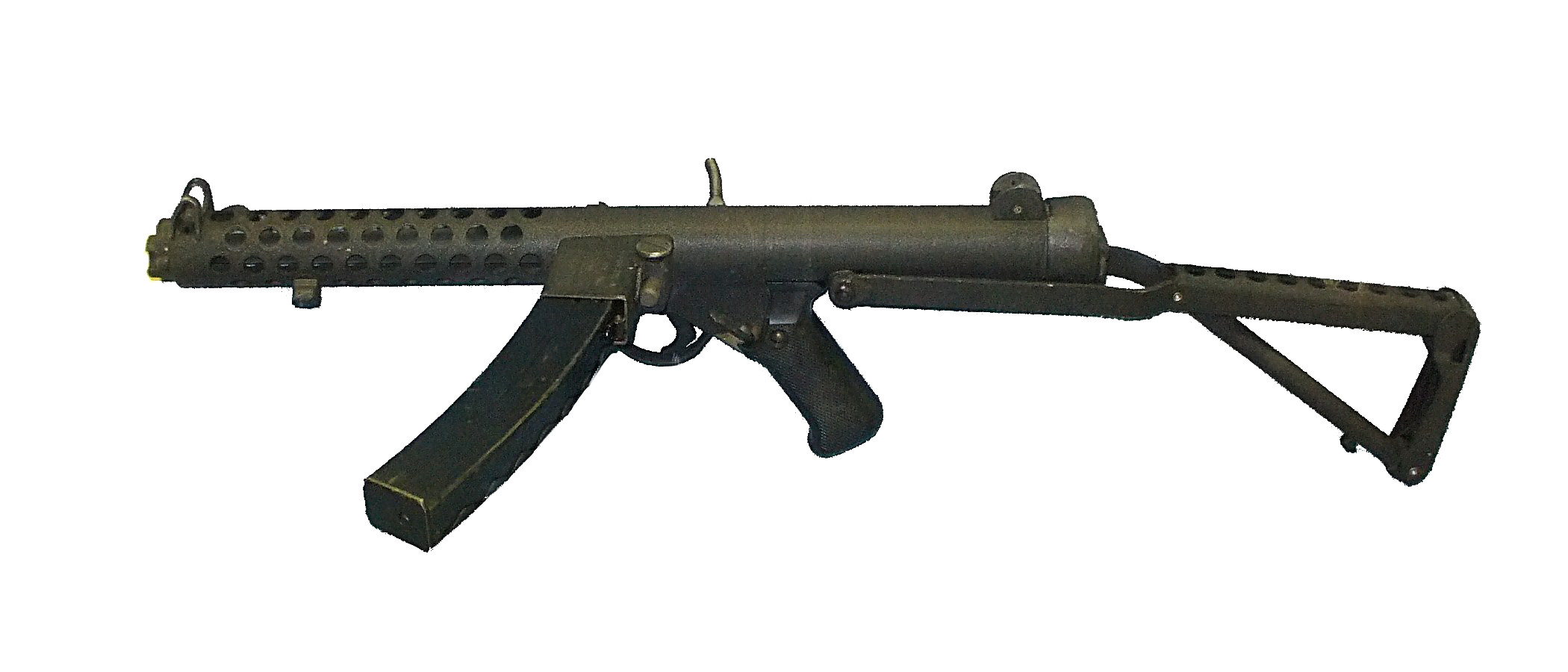

- Sterling/Patchett Machine Carbine Mark 1- British submachine gun first produced in 1944 but only trialled and used in small numbers during the war.

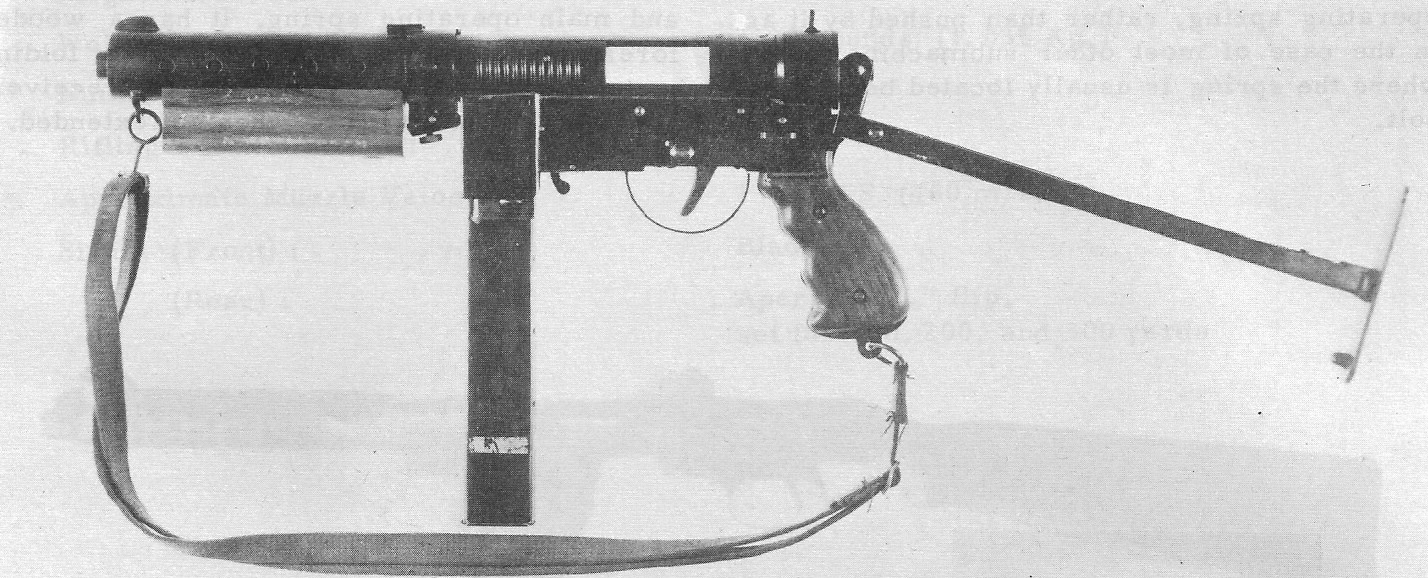

- BSA Welgun – The Welgun was a prototype submachine gun developed by the British irregular warfare organisation, the Special Operations Executive. Although it performed well in tests, it was never adopted, and was produced in small numbers only.

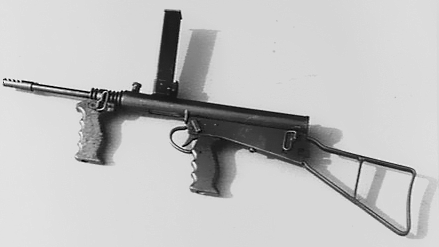

- Owen gun - Fully automatic submachine gun designed in Australia in 1938 and entered service in 1942. Used by British and commonwealth forces throughout the war.

=== Machine guns ===
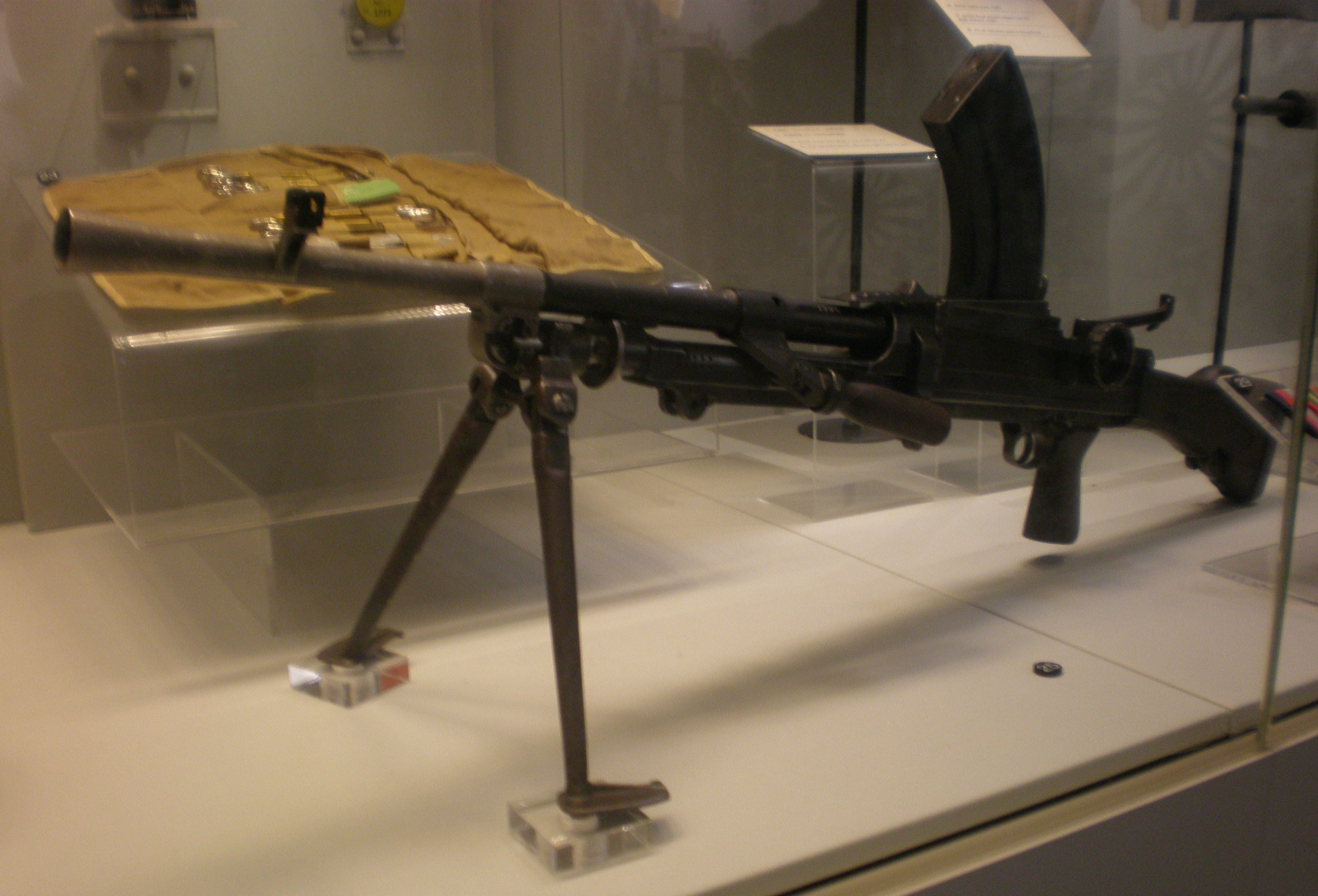
The Bren was the main British light machine gun (LMG) of the war

- Bren light machine gun – Light machine gun for infantry use introduced in 1930s and used throughout the whole of the war.

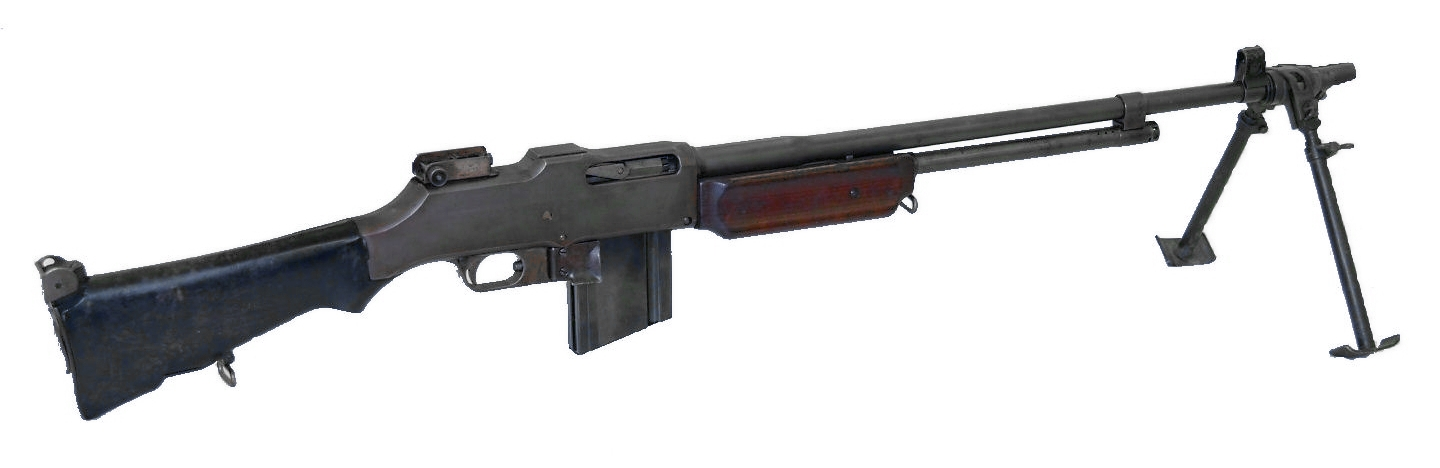

- Browning Automatic Rifle (BAR) – issued to Home Guard

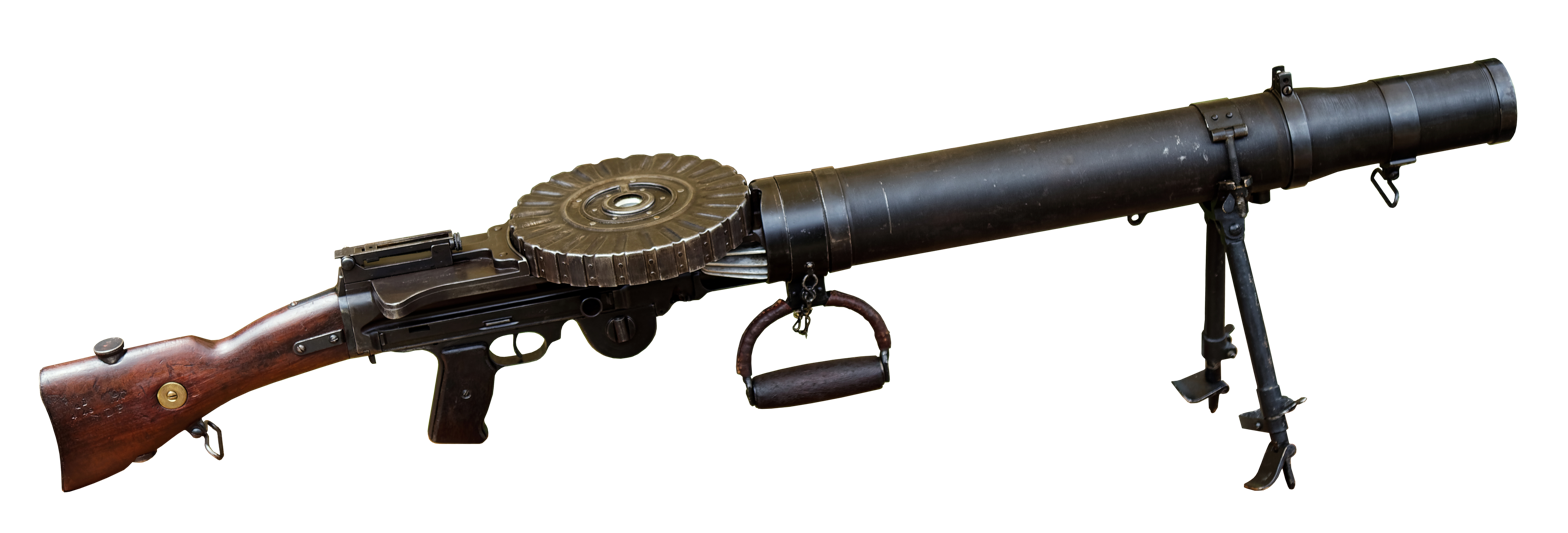

- Lewis Gun – in service with some infantry at outbreak of war in small numbers, issued to British Home Guard for the rest of the war.

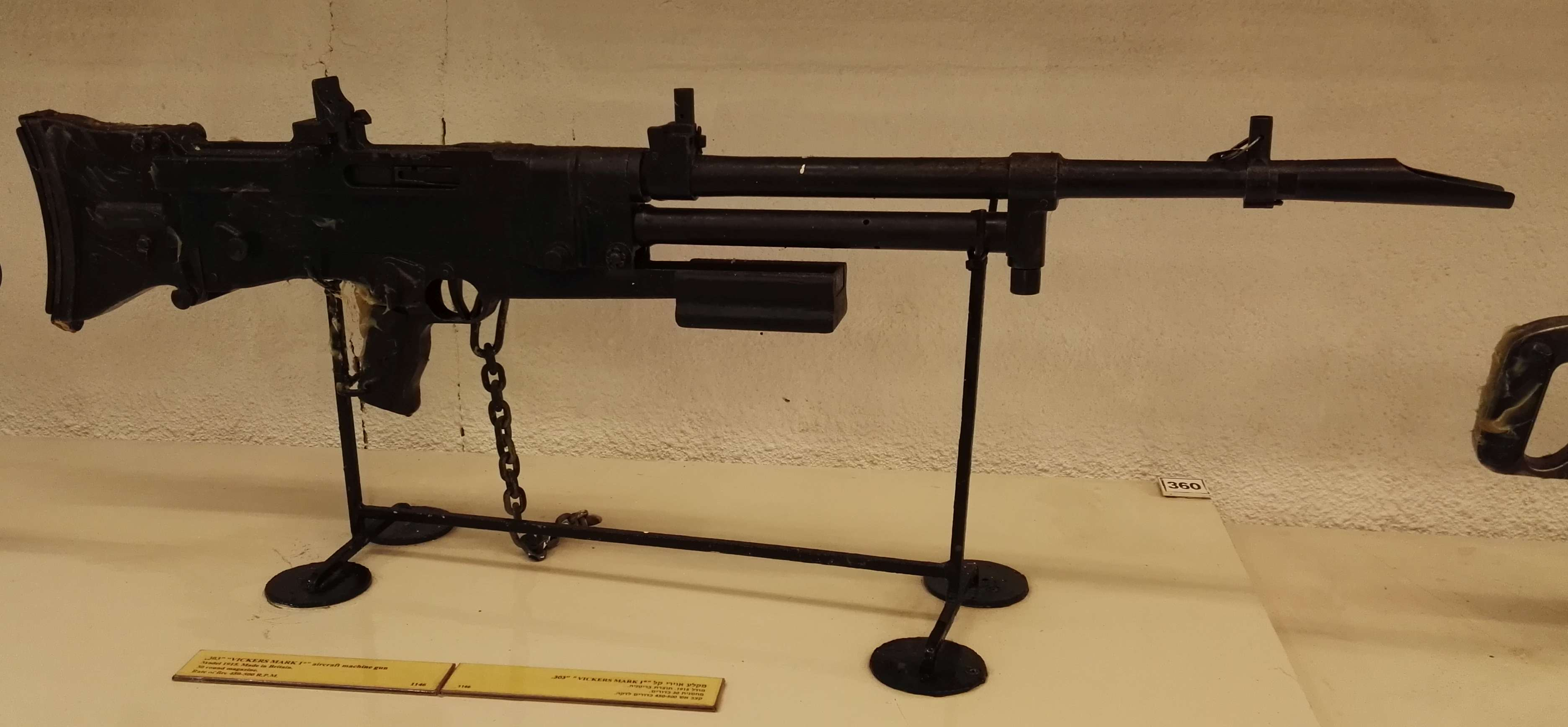

- Vickers "K" machine gun also known as VGO – fast-firing aircraft machine gun, used in specialist roles on Long Range Desert Group and Special Air Service vehicles in North Africa, as well as a short-lived infantry machine gun with the Commandos.

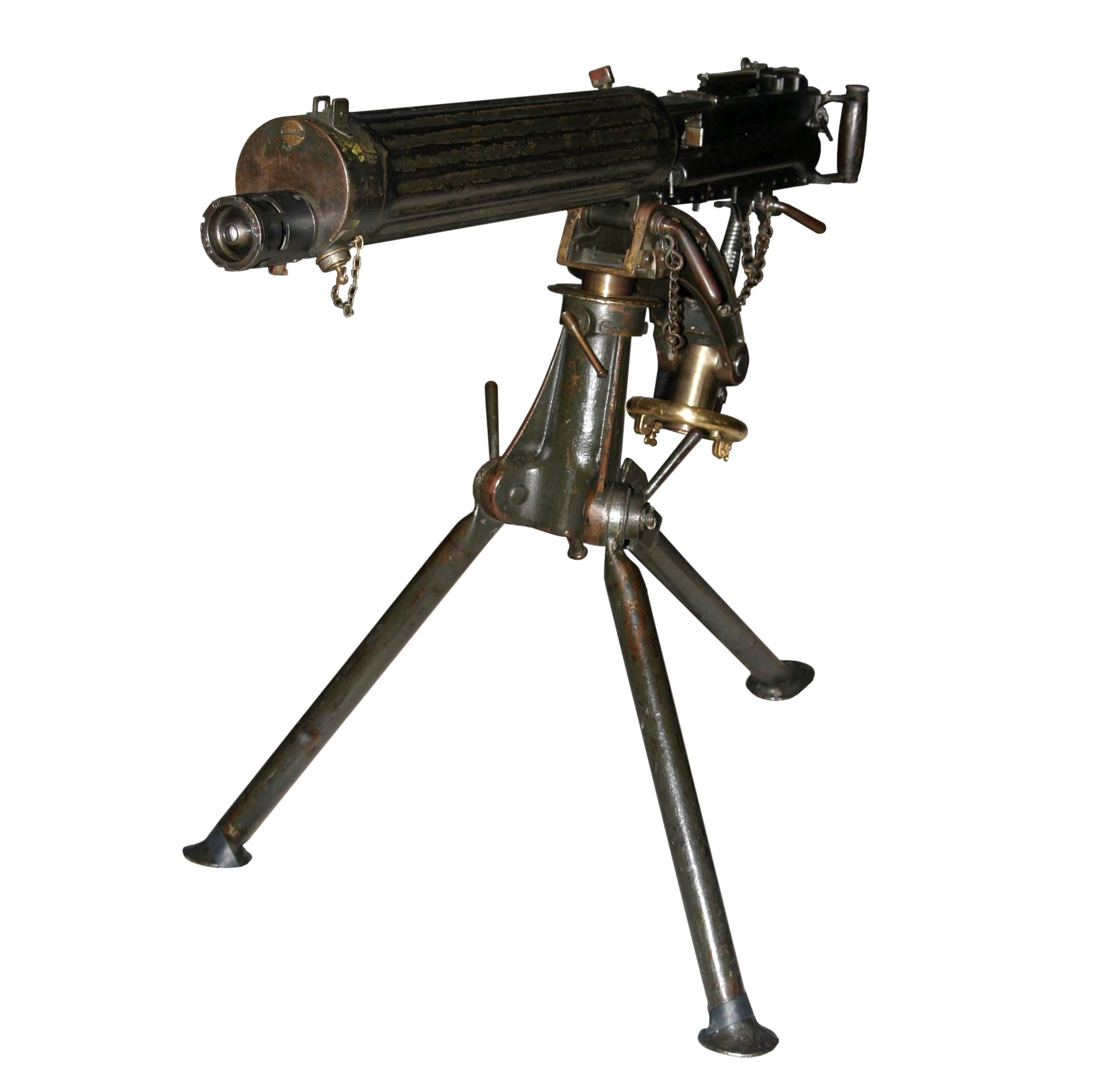

- Vickers machine gun – standard medium machine gun of the British Army since 1912.

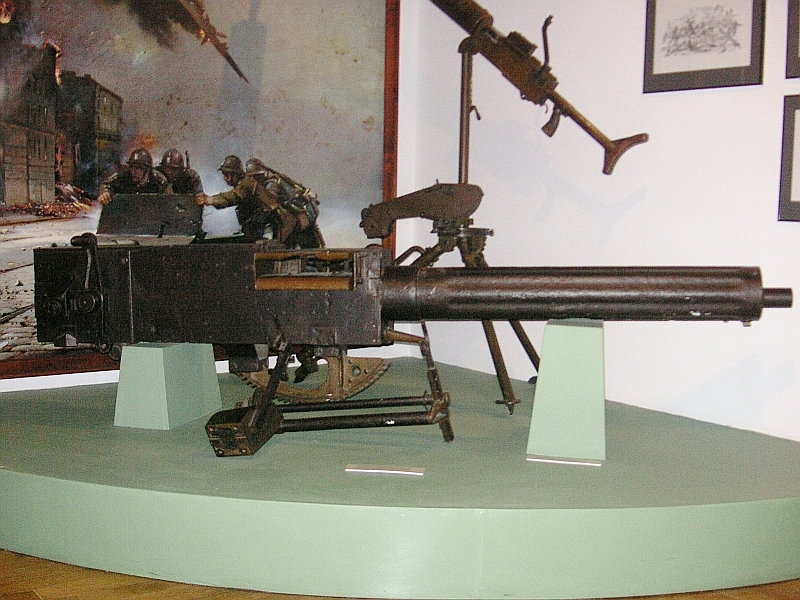

- Vickers .50 machine gun – used as a mounted armament on fighting vehicles, as well as an anti-aircraft weapon by the Royal Navy and other allied ships.

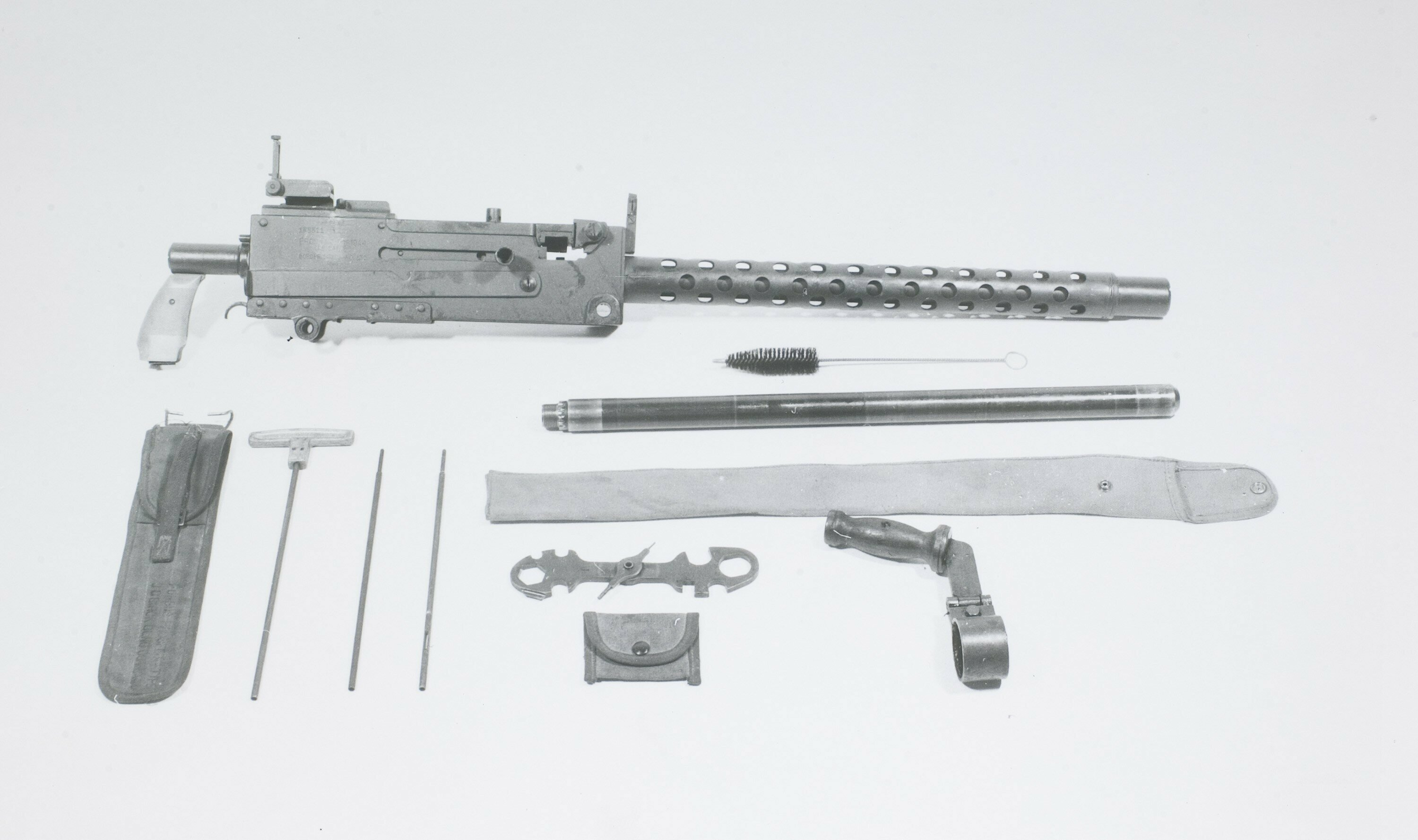

- Browning M1919 – used by multiple countries during the war.

- Browning M2 – heavy machine gun, mounted on many lend-lease vehicles.

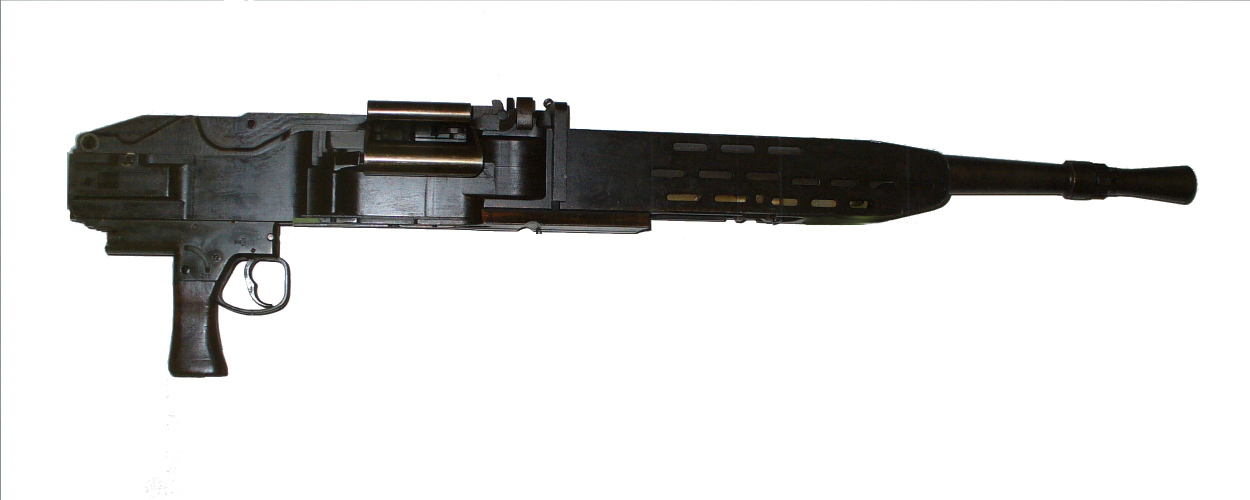

- Besa machine gun – in 7.92mm BESA and 15mm BESA forms used as armament on British-built tanks and armoured cars only.

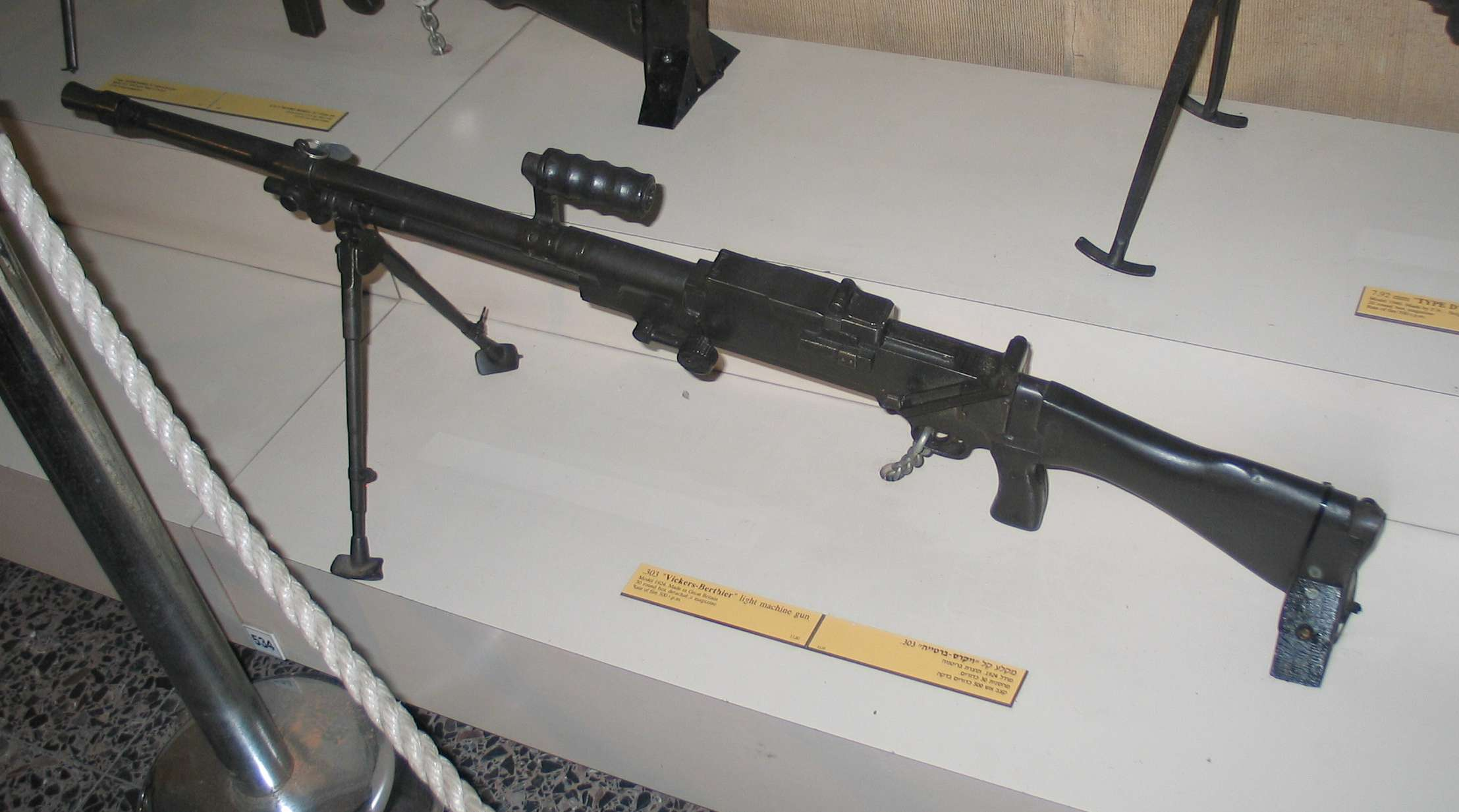

- Vickers-Berthier – light machine gun adopted by British Indian Army before the war, and used until replaced by Bren guns around 1942.
- Besal – designed as a lighter, simpler, and cheaper to manufacture alternative to the Bren gun, never went into mass production.

=== Handguns ===
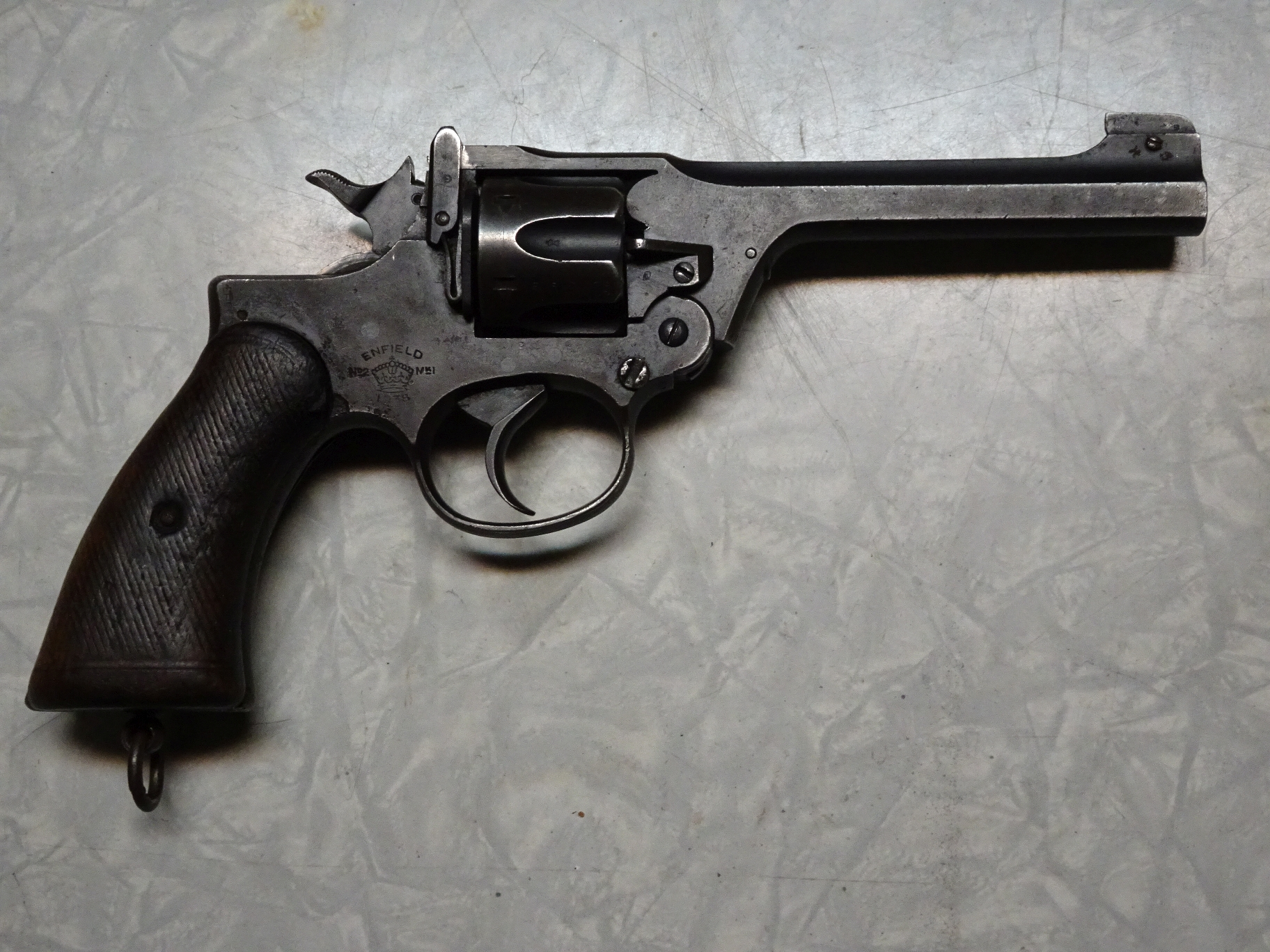

- Enfield No.2 Mk.1 Revolver

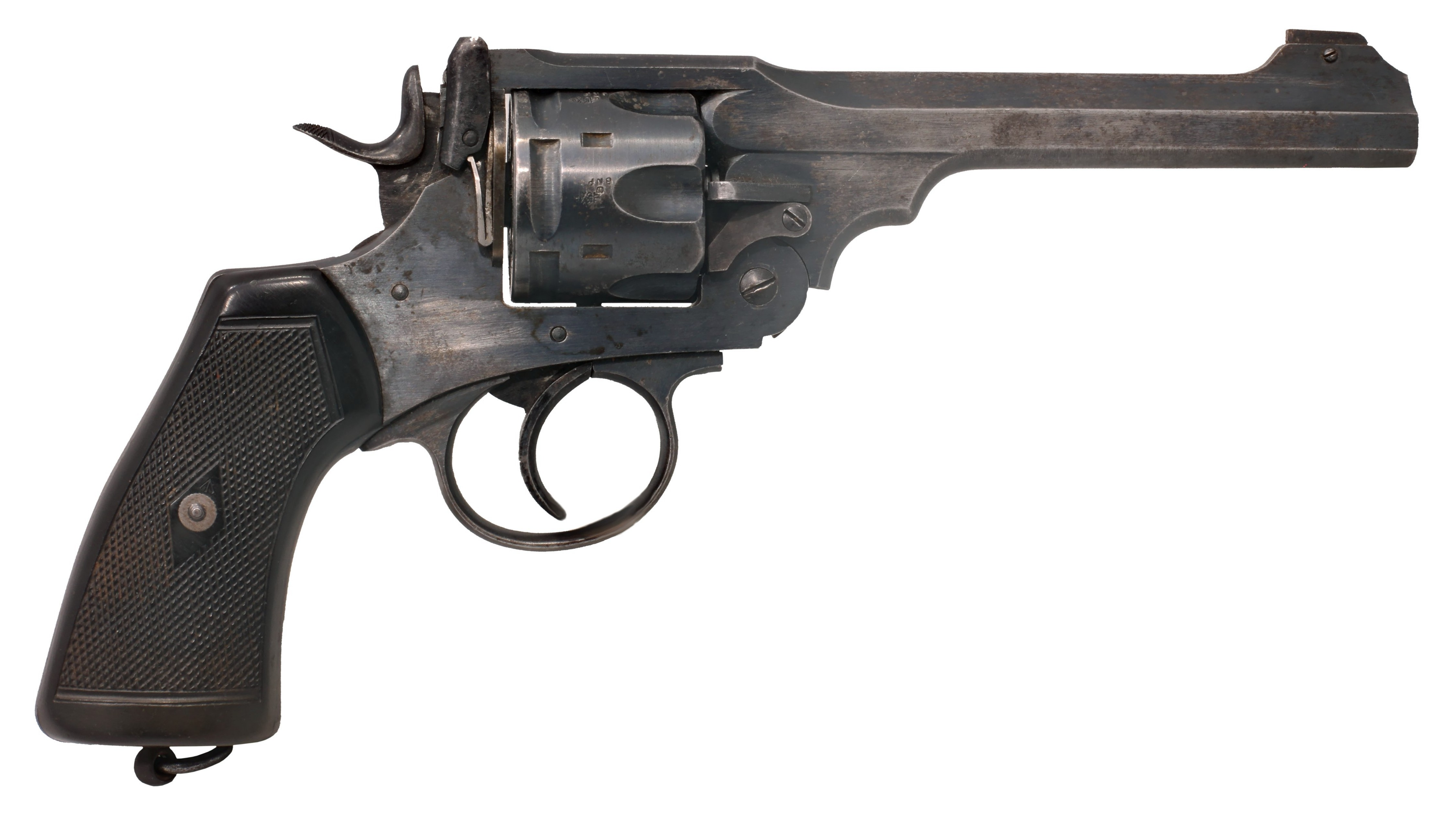

- Webley Revolver – many marks in .38 and .455 calibres

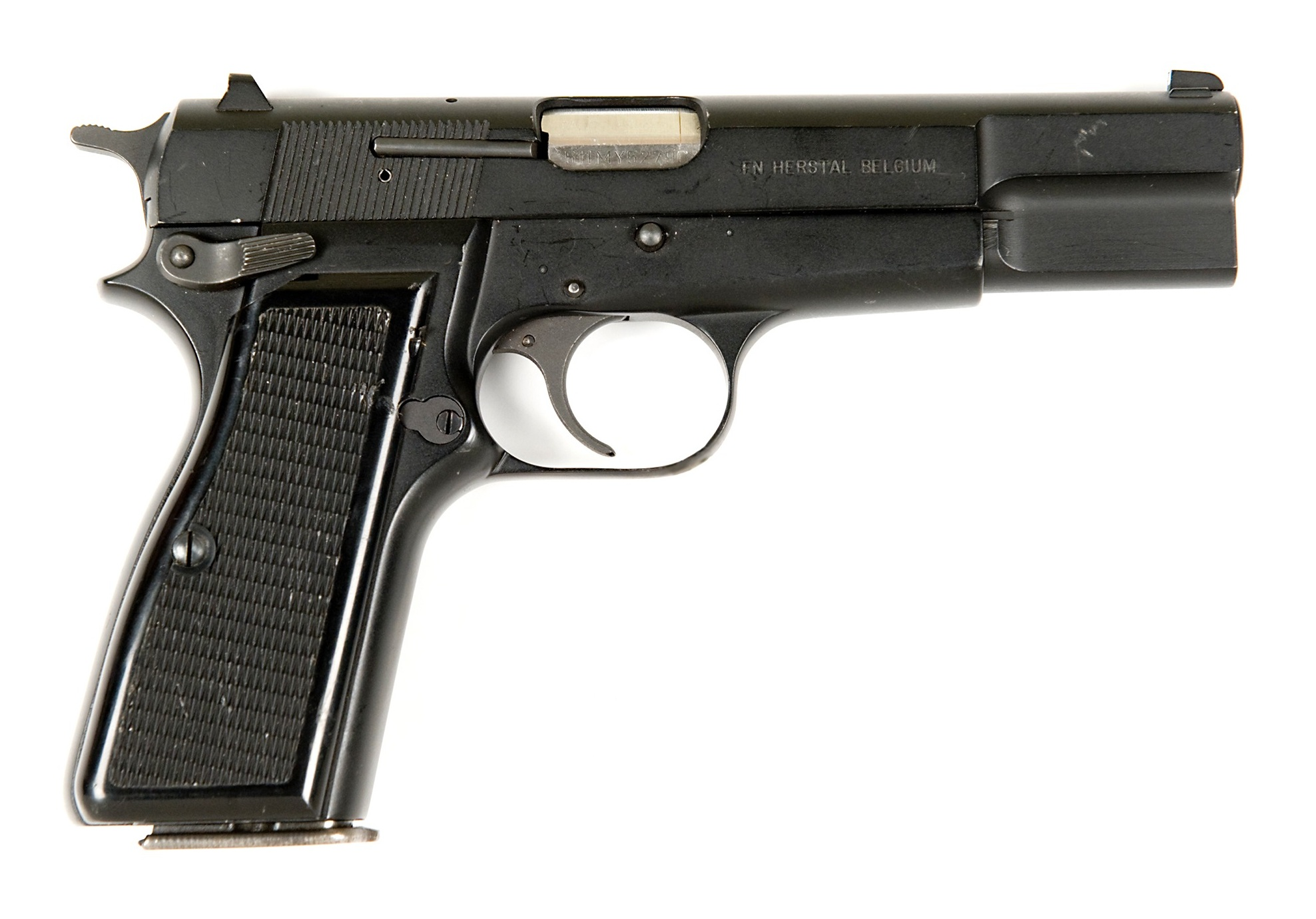

- Browning FN-Inglis "Pistol No.II Mk.I*"

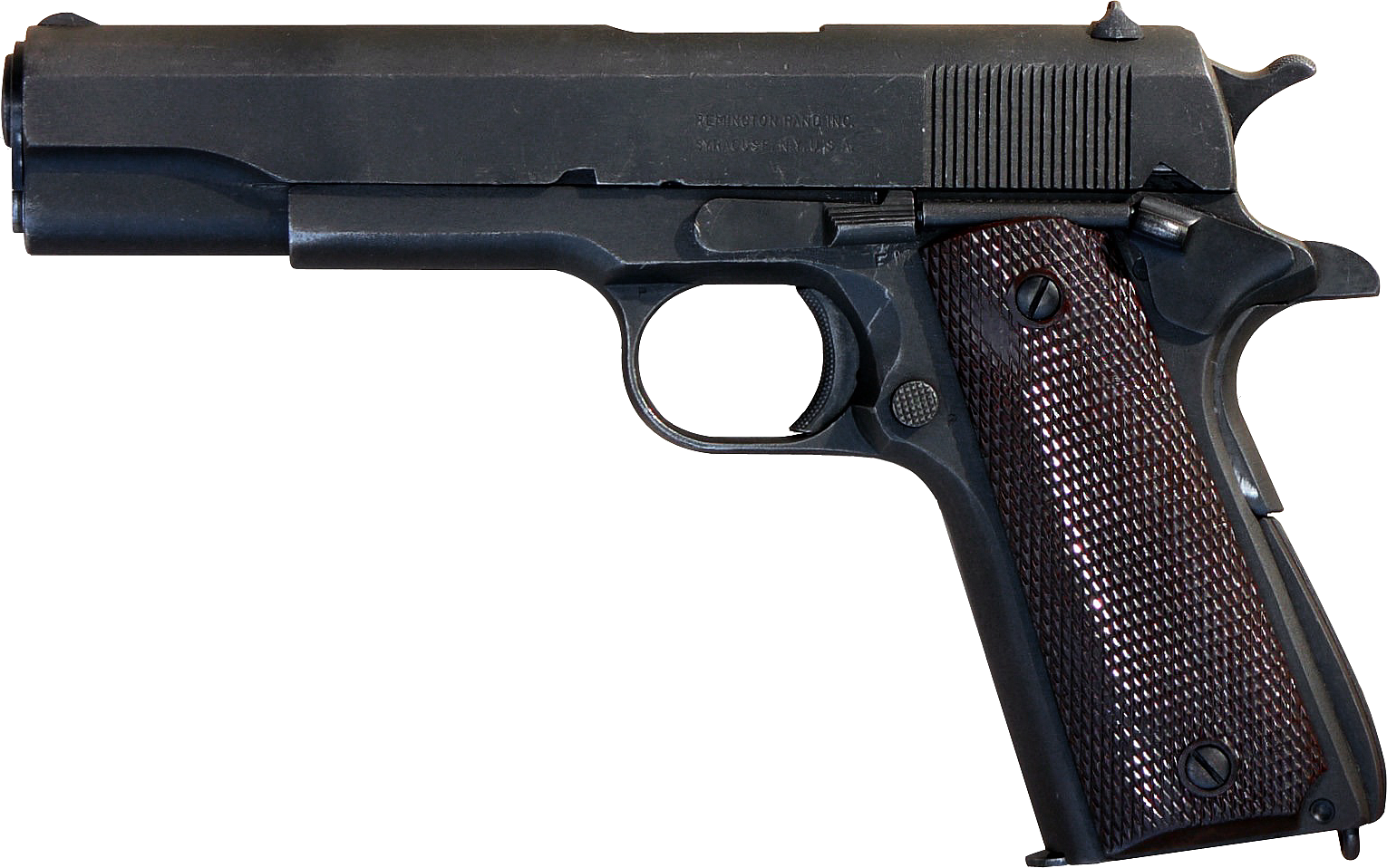

- Colt M1911A1

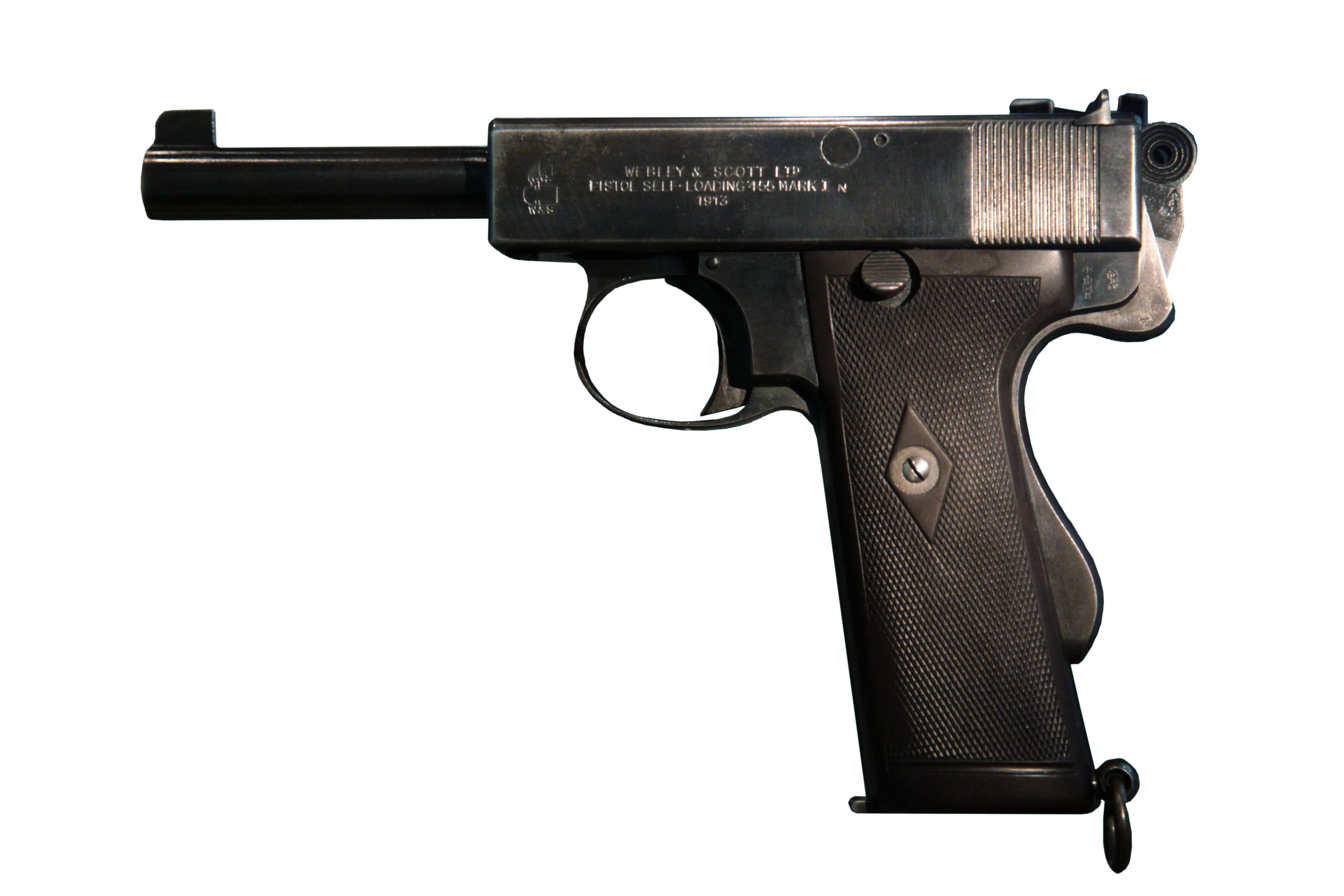

- Webley No.I Mk.I – automatic pistol in .455 inch. Issued to the Royal Navy

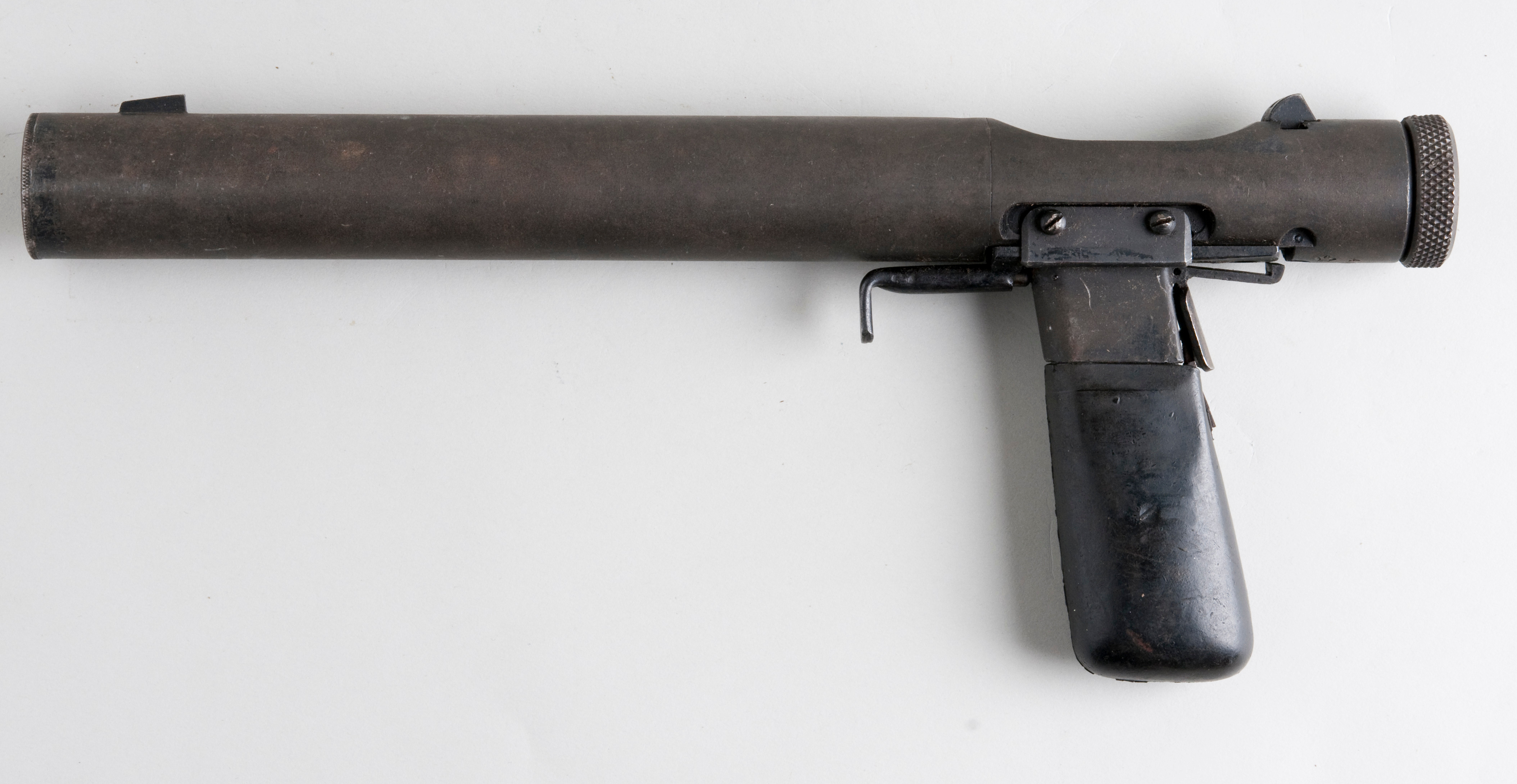

- Welrod – a suppressed bolt-action pistol

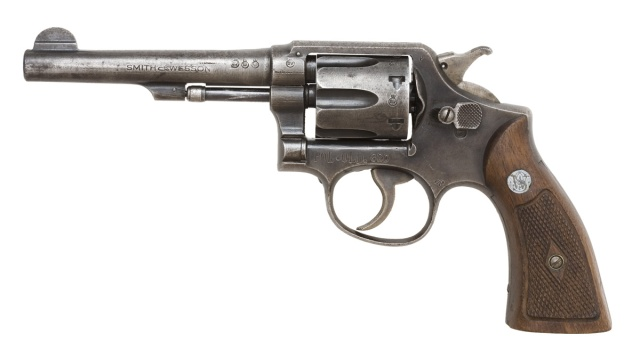

- Smith & Wesson Model 10

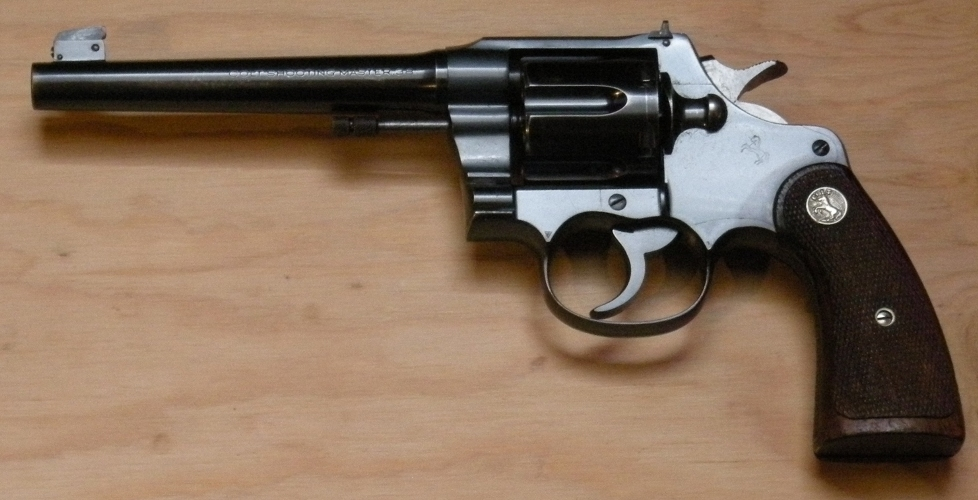

- Colt New Service

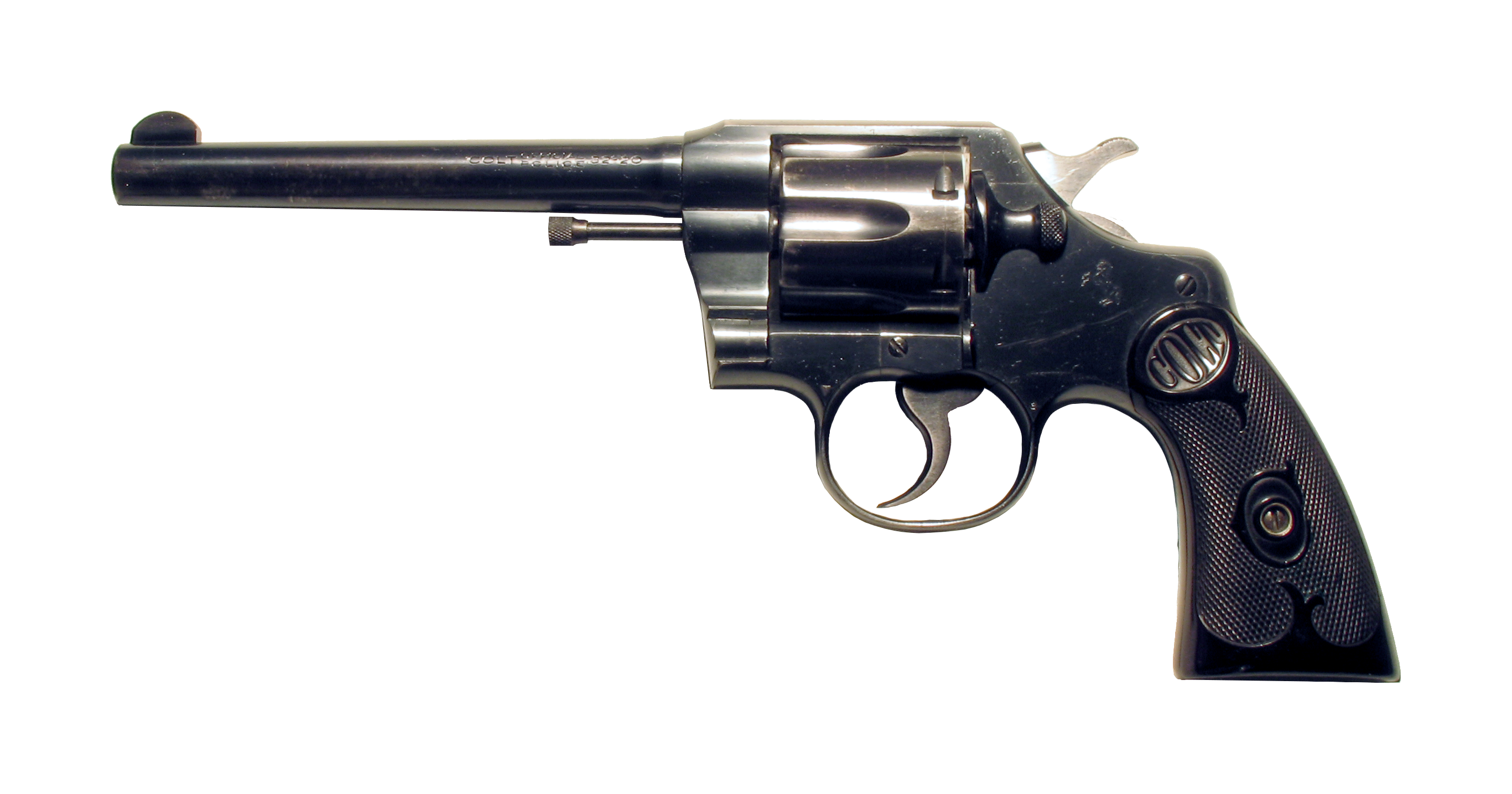

- Colt Official Police.

=== Grenades ===
- Grenade, hand or rifle, No. 36M Mk.I "Mills bomb"
- "Grenade, rifle No.68 /AT" high-explosive anti-tank (HEAT) rifle grenade
- No.69 Mk.I bakelite concussion hand grenade
- No.76, special incendiary phosphorus hand grenade
- No.73 anti-tank hand grenade "thermos grenade"
- Grenade, hand, No.74 ST "sticky bomb"
- No.75 anti-tank hand grenade "Hawkins grenade"/"Hawkins mine"
- No.77 white phosphorus hand grenade
- Grenade, hand, No. 82 "Gammon bomb".

=== Landmines ===
- A.T. Mine G.S. Mark II
- A.T. Mine G.S. Mark III
- A.T. Mine G.S. Mark IV
- A.T. Mine G.S. Mark V
- A.T. Mine E. P. Mark II
- A.T. Mine E.P. Mark V
- A.T. Mine E.P. Mark VI
- A.P. Shrapnel Mine Mark I and II
- A.P. Mine No. 3
- A.P. and Anti-Tire Mine
- A.P. Mine E.P. No. 4
- A.P. Mine No.5
- Mine A.P. Improvised Type I
- Mine A.P. Improvised Type II

=== Other ===
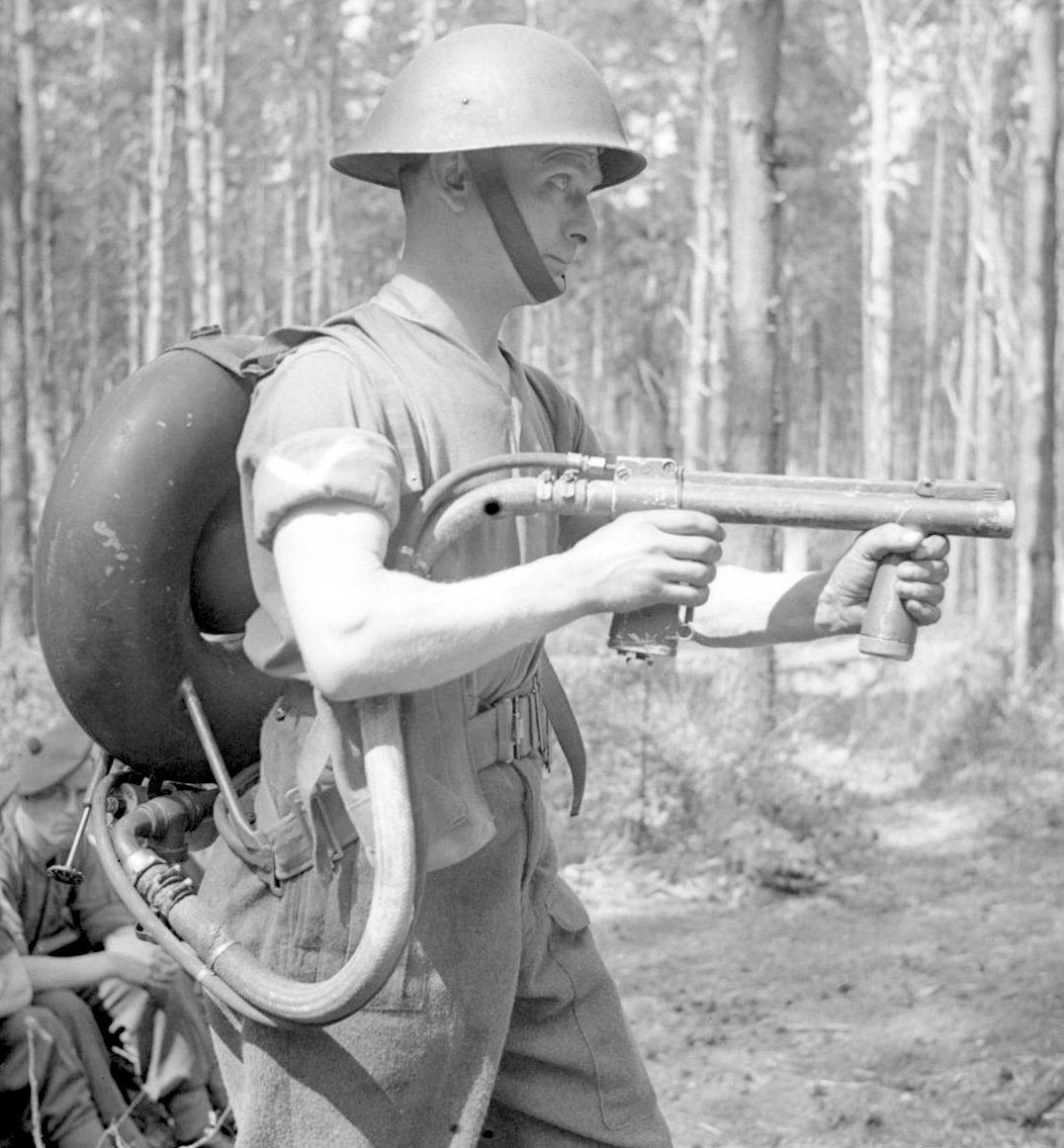
Soldier with No 2 mk II "lifebuoy"

- No.II Mk.II Flamethrower "Lifebuoy"
- Lewes bomb – Used by the SAS
- Land Mattress – Multiple rocket launcher
- Fairbairn–Sykes fighting knife
- Pattern 1907 bayonet
- Smatchet
- Kukri

=== Infantry anti-tank weapons ===
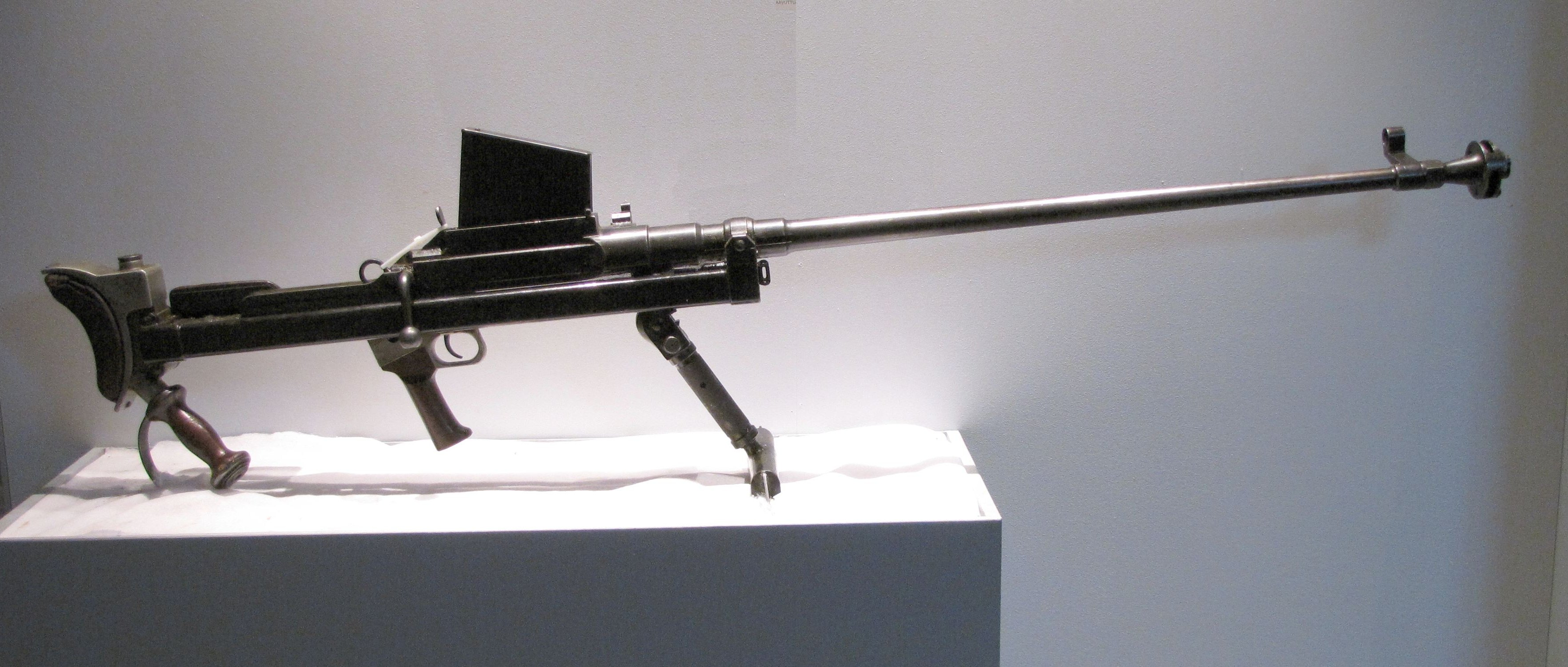
Boys anti-tank rifle which was the main infantry anti-tank weapon of the British Army in the early war

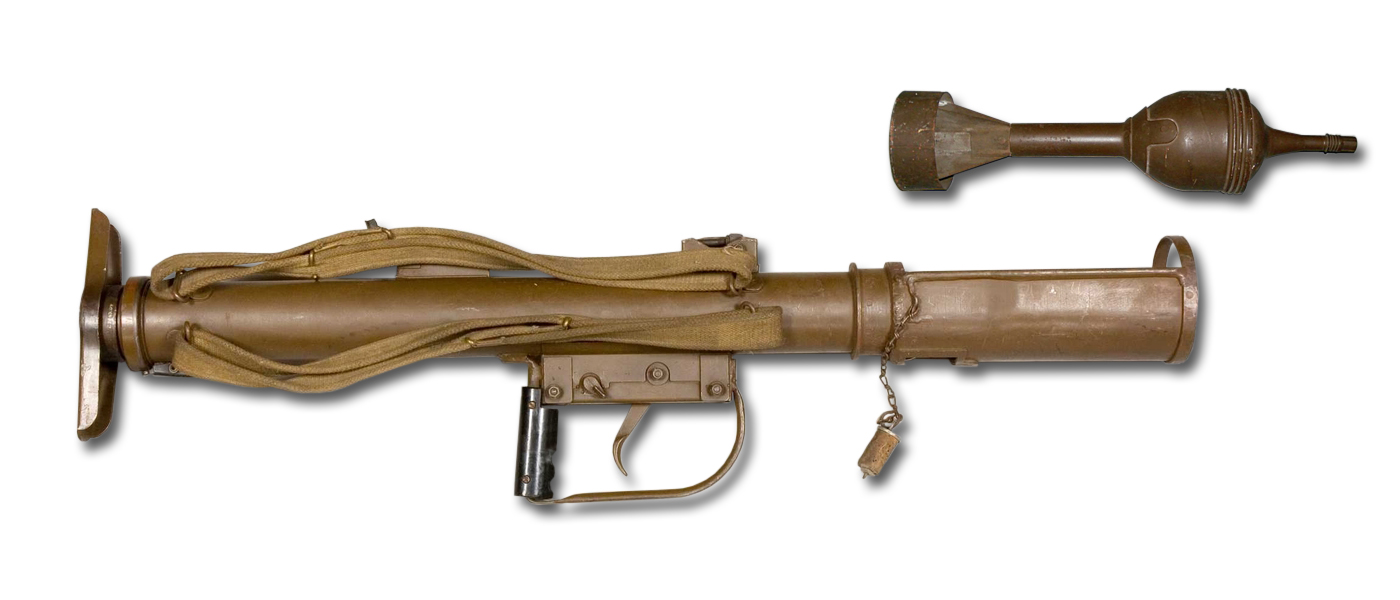
PIAT (Projector, Infantry, Anti-tank) along with ammunition

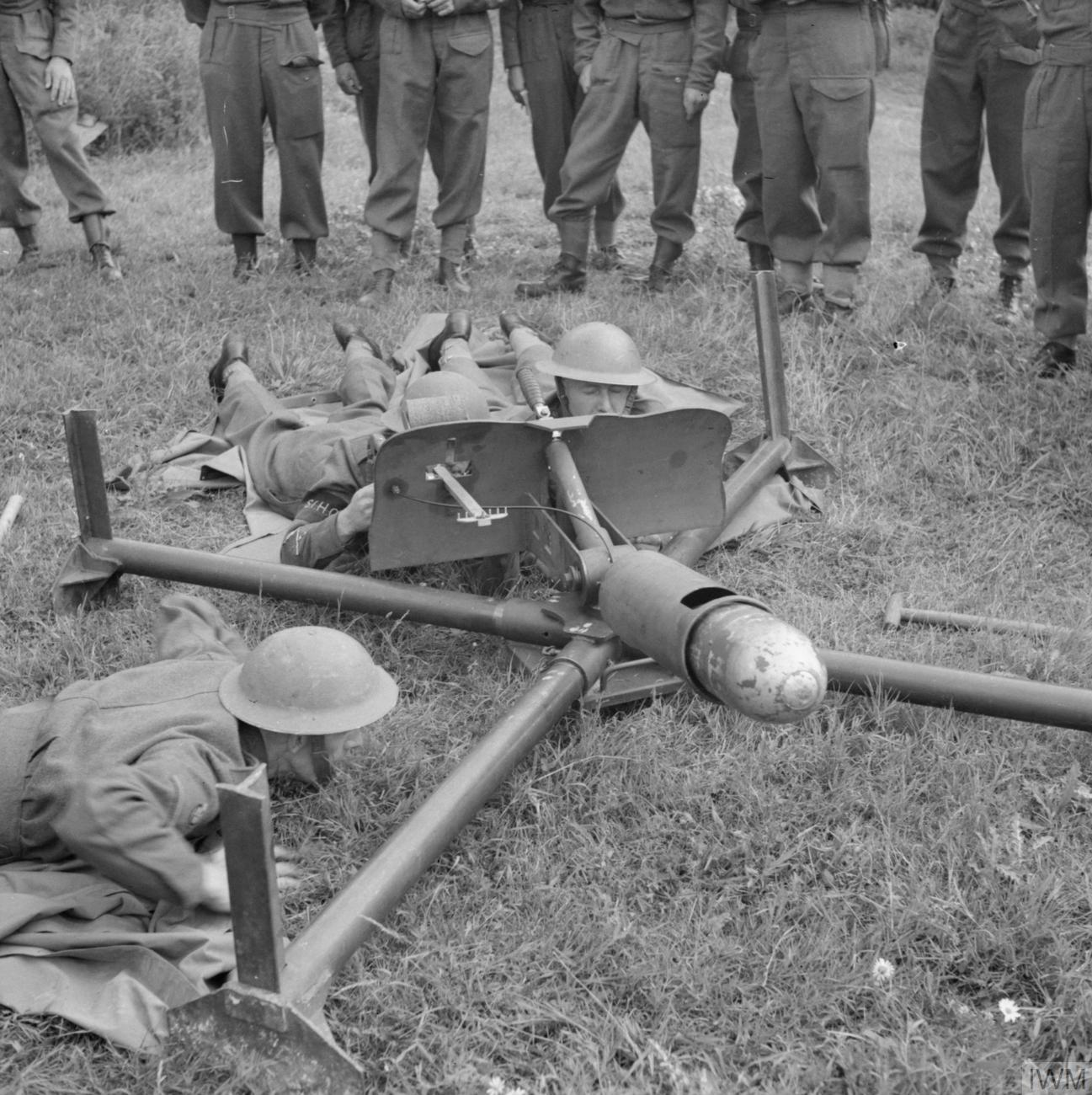

- Blacker Bombard – spigot mortar firing round. Issued for home defence only
- Rifle, Anti-Tank, .55in, Boys "Boys anti-tank rifle" – infantry anti-tank weapon (prewar–1943).
- Projector, Infantry, Anti-Tank (PIAT) – infantry anti-tank weapon (1943 until end of war).

== Artillery ==
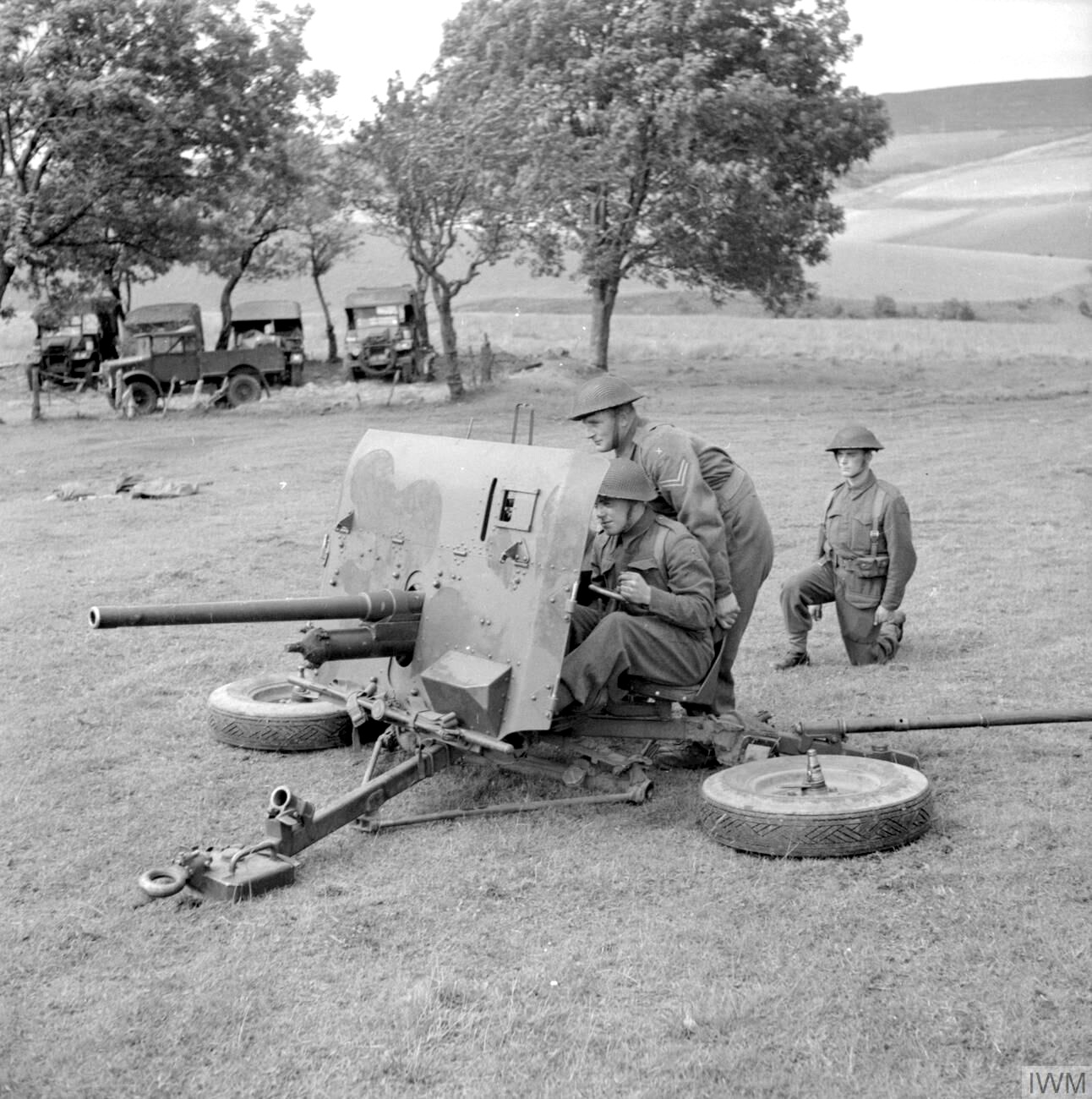
QF 2-pounder anti-tank gun was in use at start of war

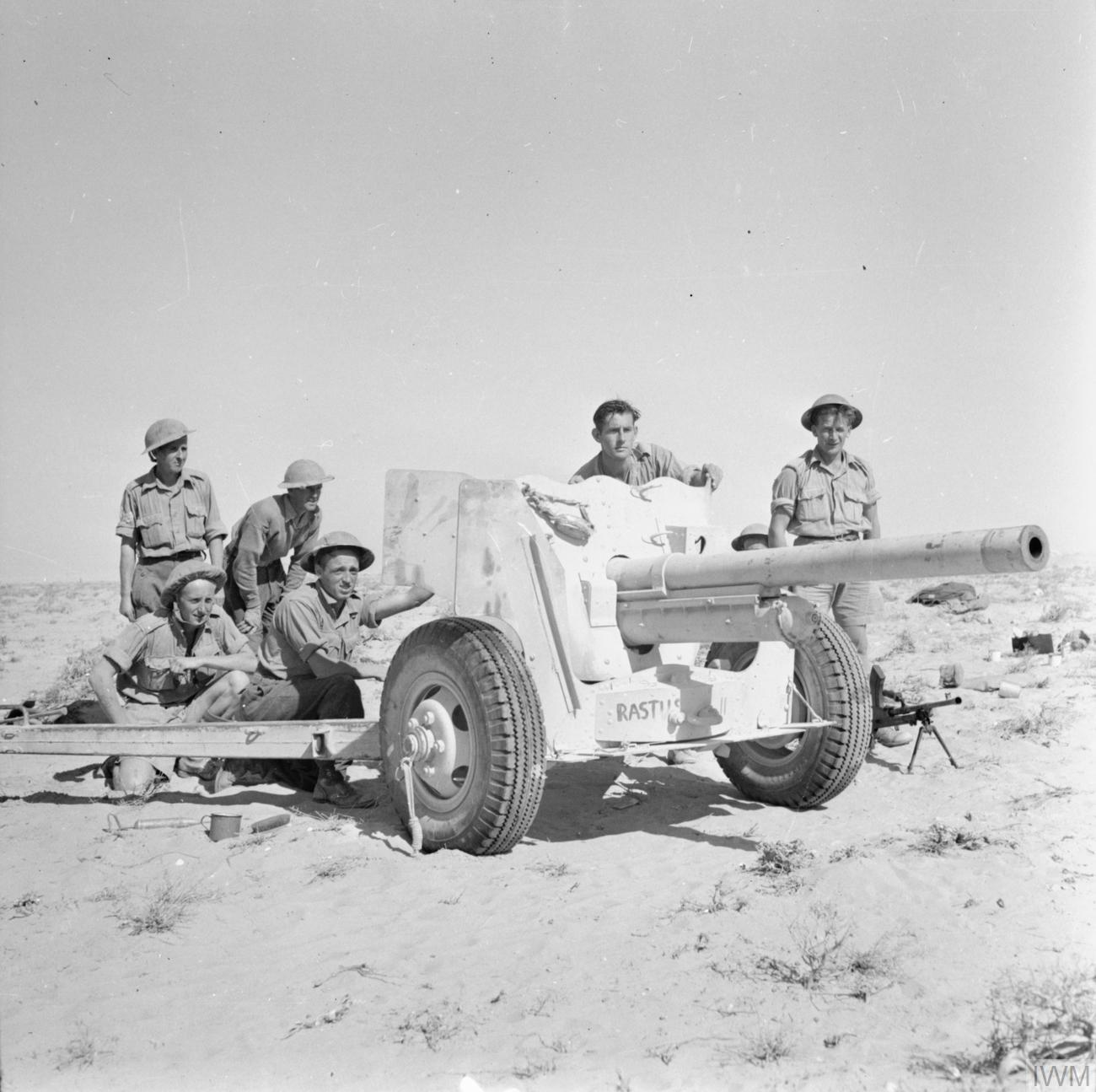
The QF 6-pounder replaced the 2-pdr

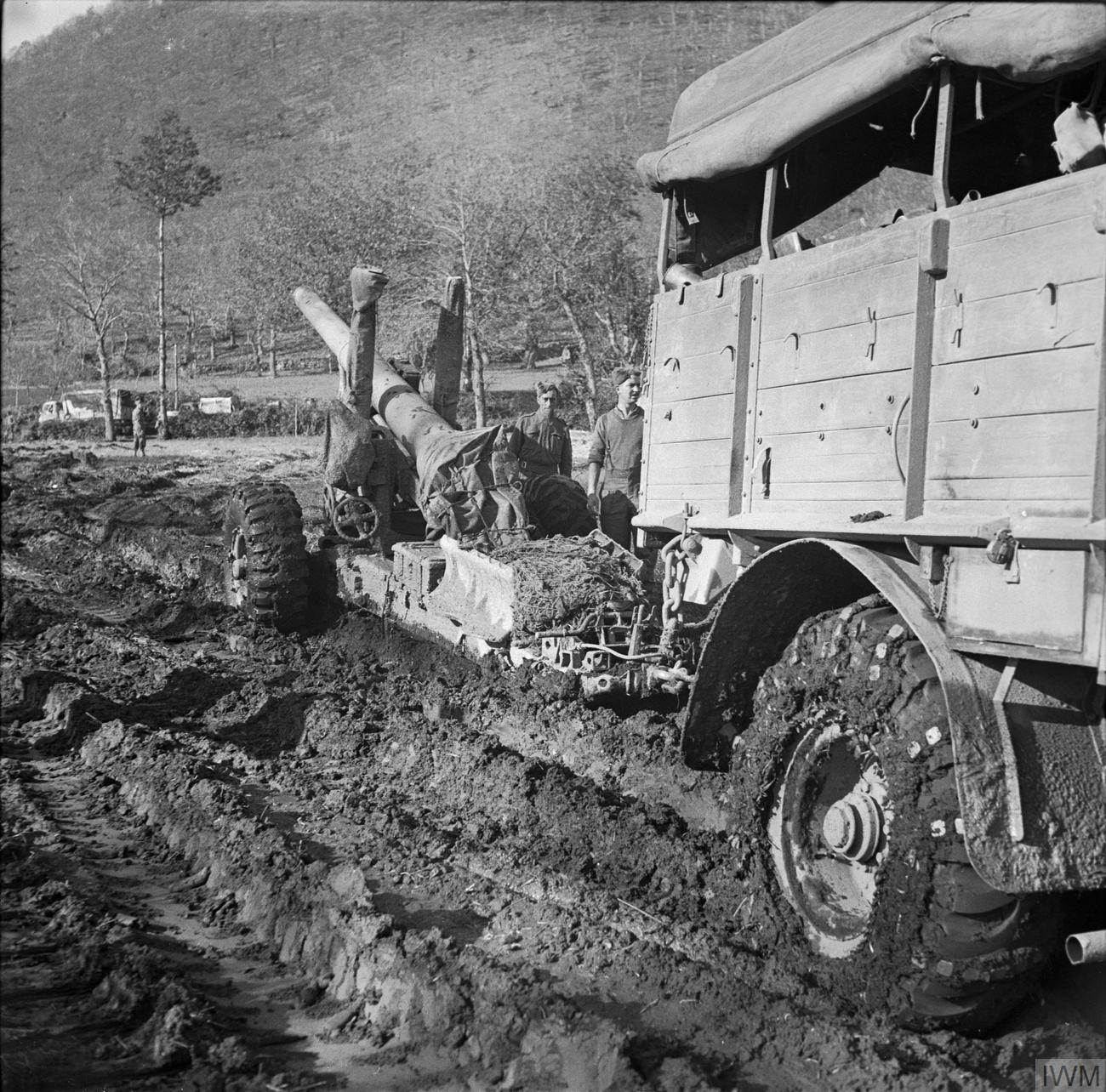
BL 5.5 inch medium gun was introduced mid war for medium gun batteries

=== Anti-tank guns ===
- Ordnance QF 2-pounder – 40 mm weapon used at start of the war
- Ordnance QF 6-pounder – 57 mm weapon that replaced 2-pounder in artillery units
- Ordnance QF 17-pounder – 76 mm weapon introduced later in war for artillery units

=== Guns and howitzers ===
- Ordnance QF 25-pounder Gun-howitzer
- BL 6-inch 26 cwt howitzer
- BL 5.5-inch Medium Gun
- BL 4.5-inch Medium Field Gun
- BL 7.2-inch Howitzer Mk.I
- BL 8-inch Howitzer – siege gun
- BL 60-pounder gun – 5-inch gun from First World War era, replaced by 4.5 inch gun during war
- 75 mm Pack Howitzer M1 and M8 – US supplied portable howitzer for use in mountainous areas
- QF 3.7-inch mountain howitzer
- Smith Gun – smoothbore weapon for Home Guard use only
- BL 9.2-inch howitzer – WWI era
- 75 mm gun M1917 – US supplied, training and home defence after fall of France
- QF 18-pounder gun – WWI era, replaced by 25 pounder

Coast defence guns

- QF 6-pounder 10 cwt
- QF 12-pounder
- QF 4.7-inch Mk I–IV
- BL 6-inch Mk VII & Mk XXIV
- BL 7.5-inch Mk VI
- BL 8-inch Mk VIII
- BL 9.2-inch Mk X
- BL 14-inch Mk VII
- BL 15-inch Mk I

Railway guns

- BL 9.2-inch Mk XIII railway gun
- BL 12-inch Mk V railway howitzer
- BL 13.5-inch Mk V railway gun
- BL 18-inch railway howitzer

=== Anti-aircraft artillery ===
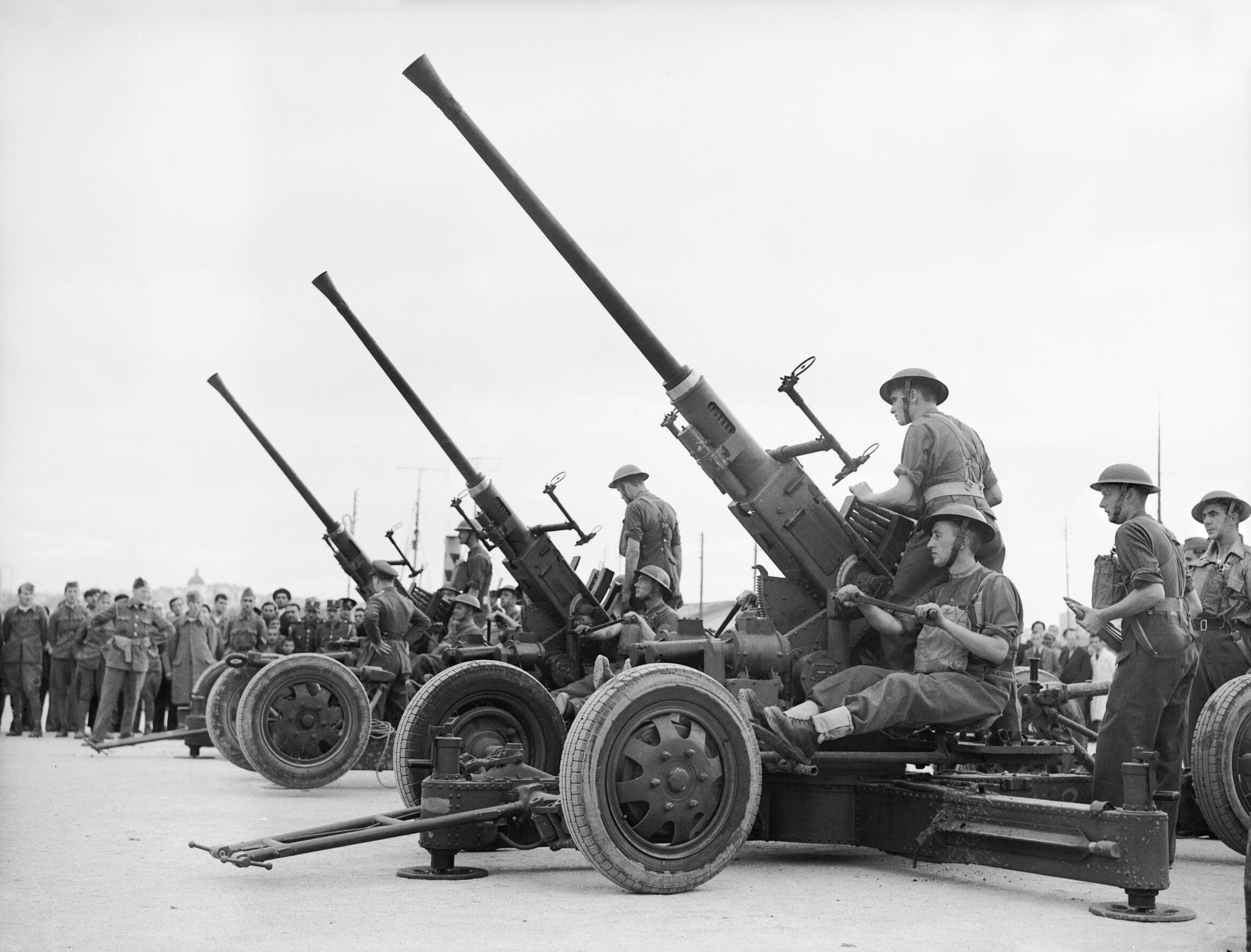
40mm Bofors guns in Greece 1940

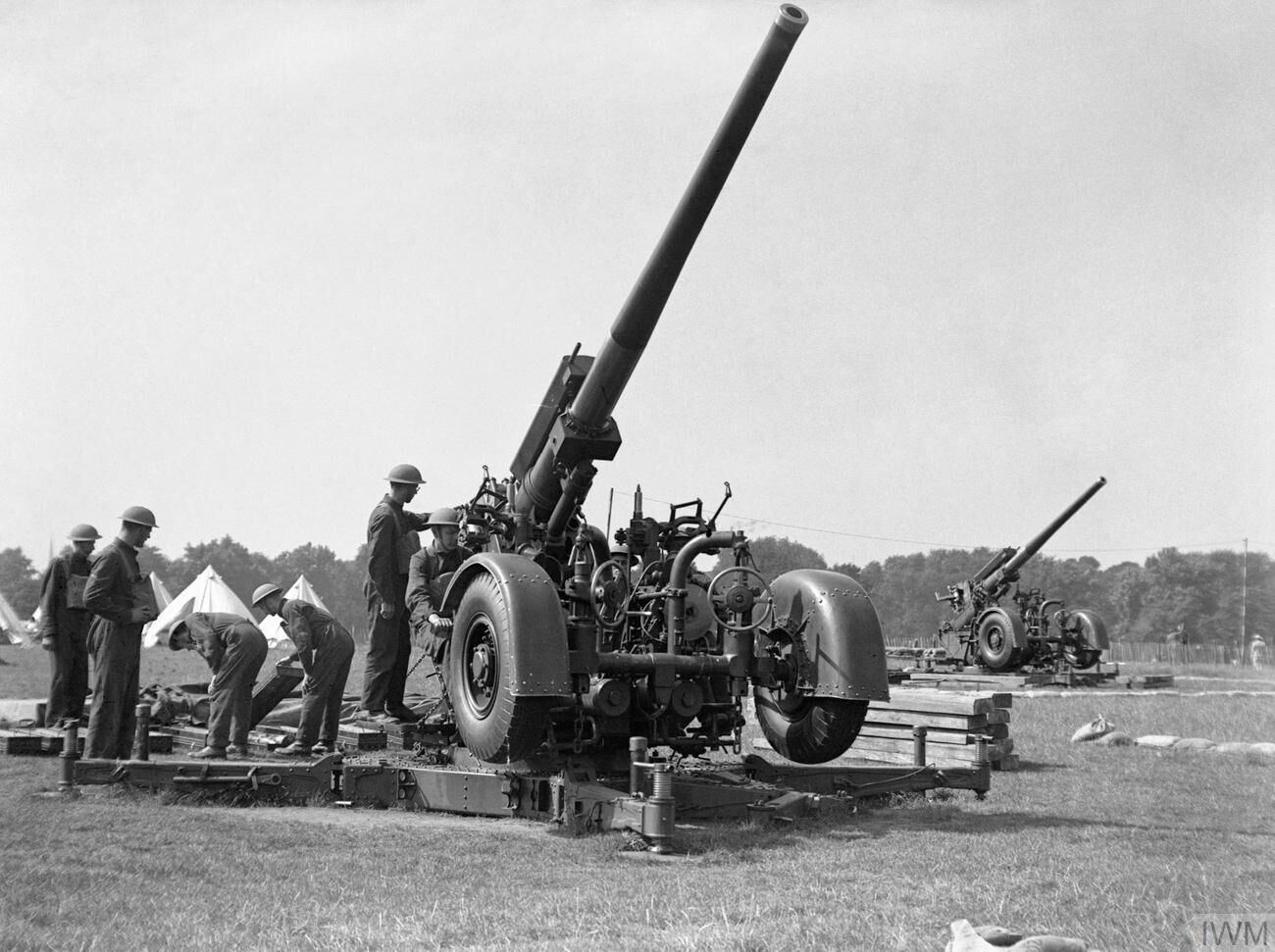
QF 3.7 inch Heavy anti-aircraft gun set up for firing

- QF 3-inch 20 cwt
- Oerlikon 20 mm cannon -light anti-aircraft gun
- 20 mm Polsten – lower cost development of Oerlikon
- 40 mm Bofors
- QF 3.7 inch AA gun
- QF 4.5-inch Mark I to Mark V
- QF 5.25-inch gun
- Z Battery
- Unrotated Projectile, including "fast aerial mine"
- Holman Projector

=== Mortars ===
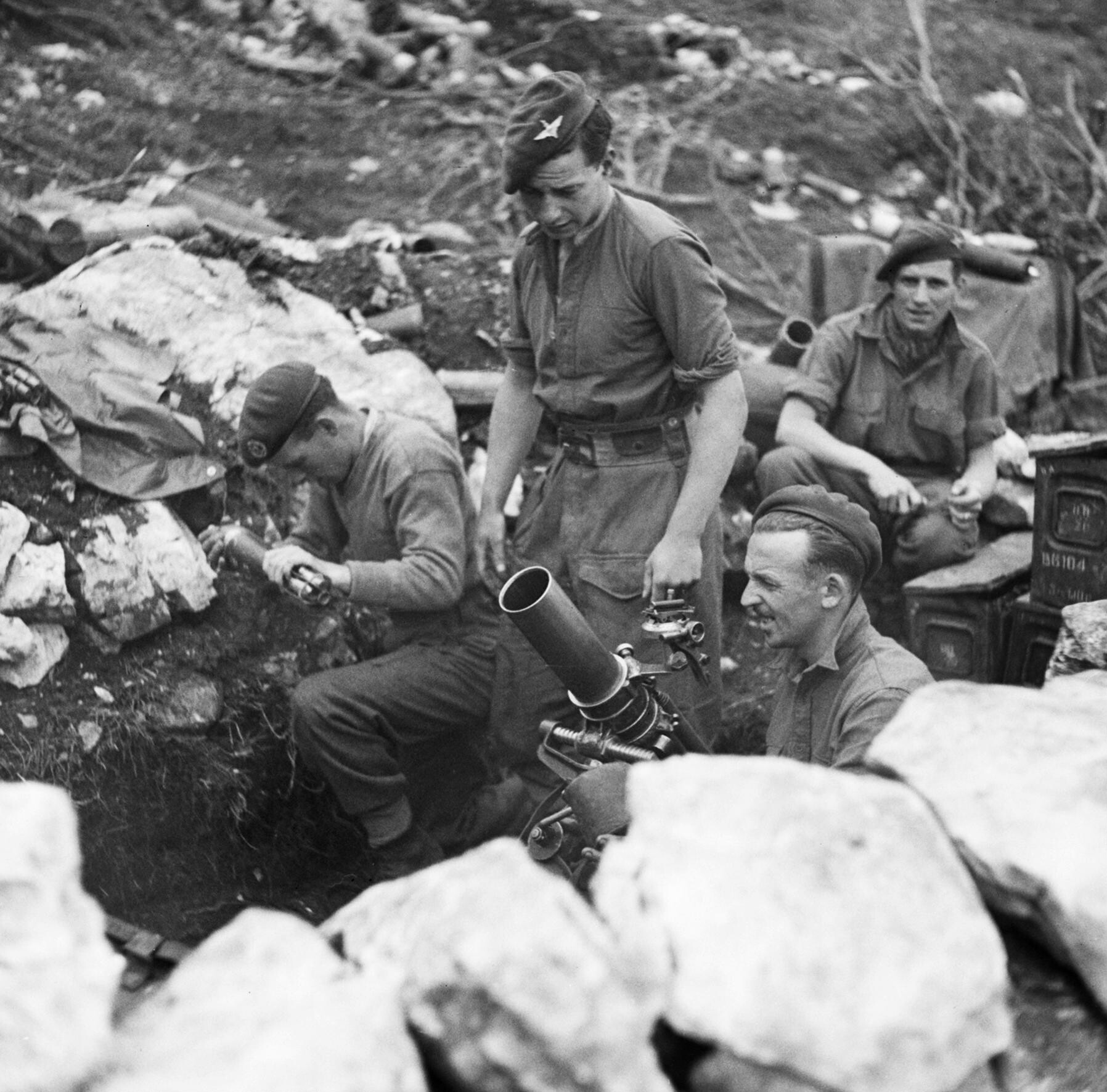
3 inch mortar with crew.

- SBML 2-inch Mortar
- Ordnance ML 3 inch Mortar
- Ordnance ML 4.2 inch Mortar
- Blacker Bombard
- Northover projector – Home Guard use.

== Vehicles ==
=== Light tanks ===
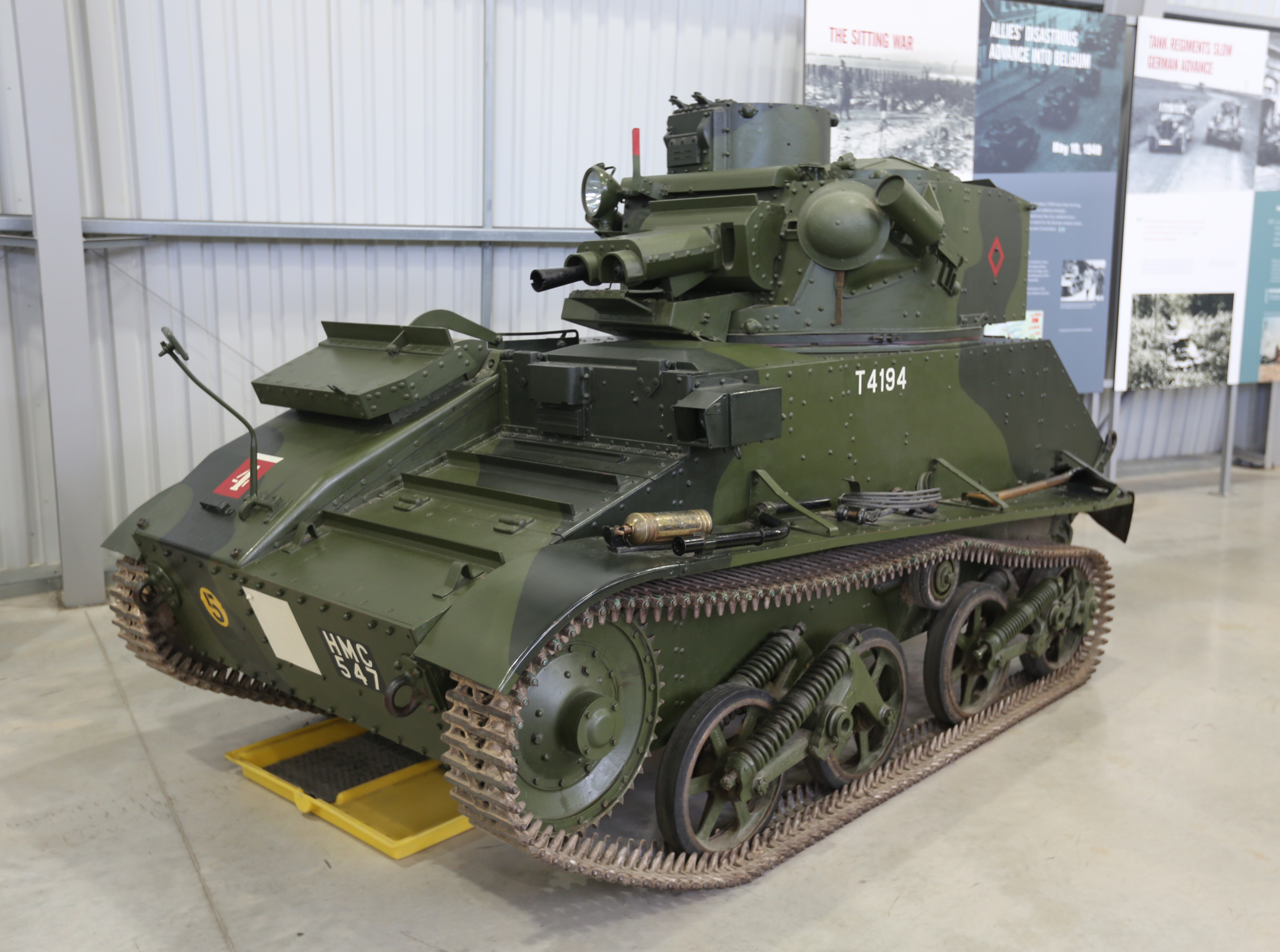
Light tank VI, main British early war light tank

- Light Tank Mk VI – The main British light tank during the opening years of the war
- Light Tank Mk VII Tetrarch – British produced light tank, most of which did not see service. A small number were supplied via lend-lease to the Soviet Union, and a small number were delivered by glider into Normandy to support British airborne forces.
- M3 and M5 Light Tanks – US supplied tank, called the 'Stuart' in British service. Despite the 'official' name of Stuart applied, most British primary sources refer to the tank as the 'Honey'.
- Light Tank (Airborne), M22 -US supplied light tank called the 'Locust', was used in small numbers in 1945.
- Light Tank, M24 – US supplied tank, called the 'Chaffee' in British service, named after General Adna R. Chaffee Jr.

=== Medium tanks ===
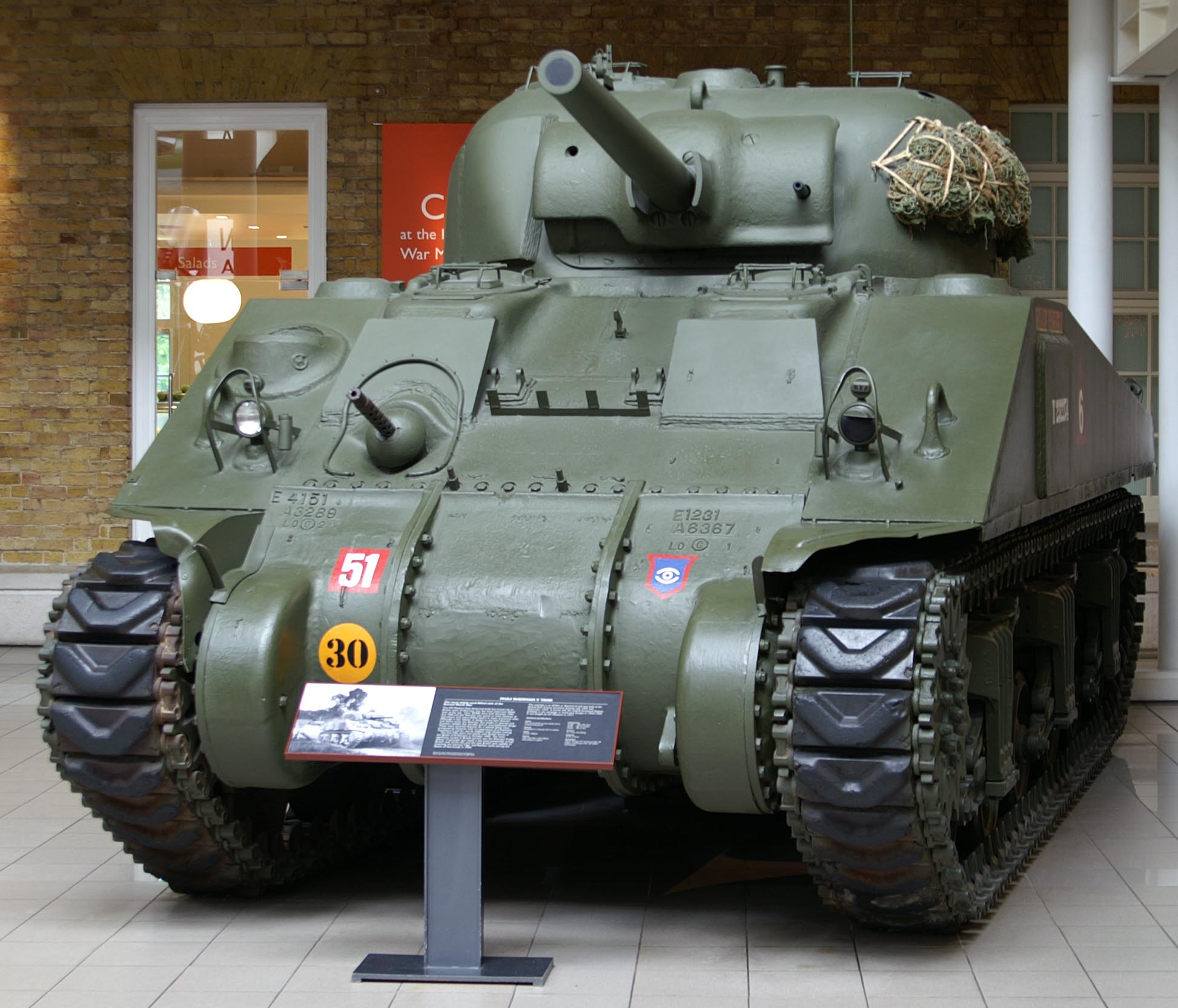
The M4 Sherman was most widely used allied tank of the war. Obtained from the US through lend-lease

- Tank, Medium, Mk.II – dug into ground with turret protruding for defence, in North Africa, & Great Britain.
- Medium Tank M3 – an American tank provided following purchase and later lend-lease. Standard production models were called the 'Lee', after Robert E. Lee. Tanks produced with a modified turret to British specification were called the 'Grant', after Ulysses S. Grant.
- Medium Tank M4 – an American tank provided under lend-lease, named Sherman by the British
  - Sherman Firefly – a Sherman rearmed with a British 17-pounder anti-tank gun, in addition to accompanying turret modifications.

=== Cruiser tanks ===
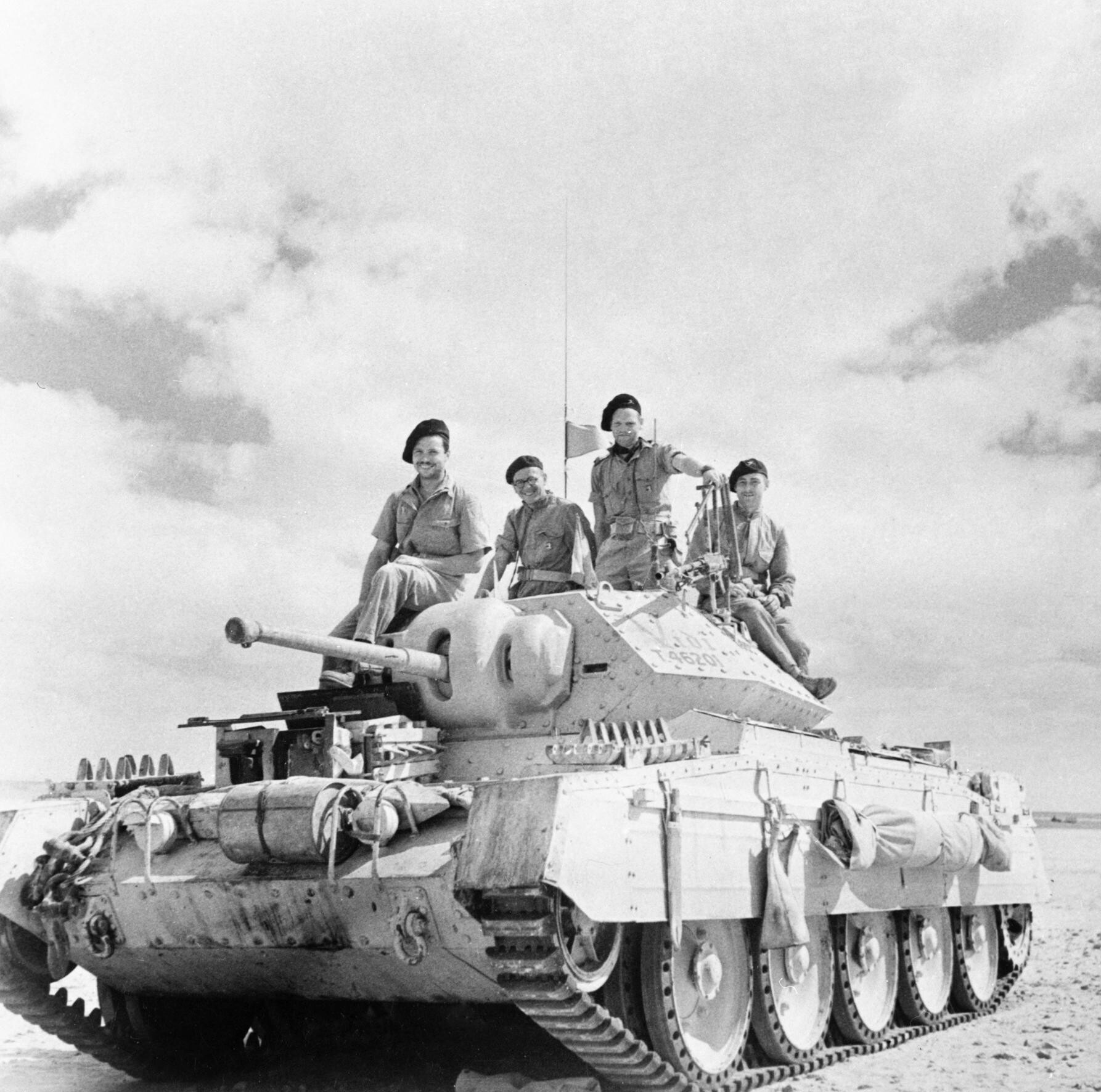
The Cruiser Mark VI Crusader was the main British mid war cruiser tank. In late 1942 they were supplanted by American tanks such as the M3 Lee and M4 Sherman.

- Tank, Cruiser, Mk.I (A9)
- Tank, Cruiser, Mk.II (A10)
- Tank, Cruiser, Mk.III (A13)
- Tank, Cruiser, Mk.IV (A13 Mk.II)
- Tank, Cruiser, Mk.V, Covenanter (A13 Mk.III) – training use only
- Tank, Cruiser, Mk.VI, Crusader (A15) – Entered service in 1941, replacing earlier models in combat formations
- Tank, Cruiser, Mk.VII, Cavalier (A24) – Not used as a gun tank in war. Used for training and as an observation post for artillery officers, and as an armoured recovery vehicle.
- Tank, Cruiser Mk.VIII, Centaur (A27L) – Initial models were only used for training use. Latter models, equipped with howitzers, were used for close support with only the Royal Marines Armoured Support Group.
- Tank, Cruiser, Mk.VIII, Cromwell (A27M) – First saw combat in 1944, and only used in North West Europe. The 7th Armoured Division was the only formation completely equipped with the Cromwell as its main tank. In the remaining British armoured divisions in France, it was used to only equip the armoured reconnaissance regiment.
- Tank, Cruiser, Mk.VIII, Challenger (A30) – Derived from Cromwell, enlarged chassis to carry a turret equipped with a 17-pounder anti-tank gun.
- Tank, Cruiser, Comet I (A34) – Entered service in early 1945
- Tank, Cruiser, Centurion I (A41) – Entered service too late to see combat service.

=== Infantry tanks ===
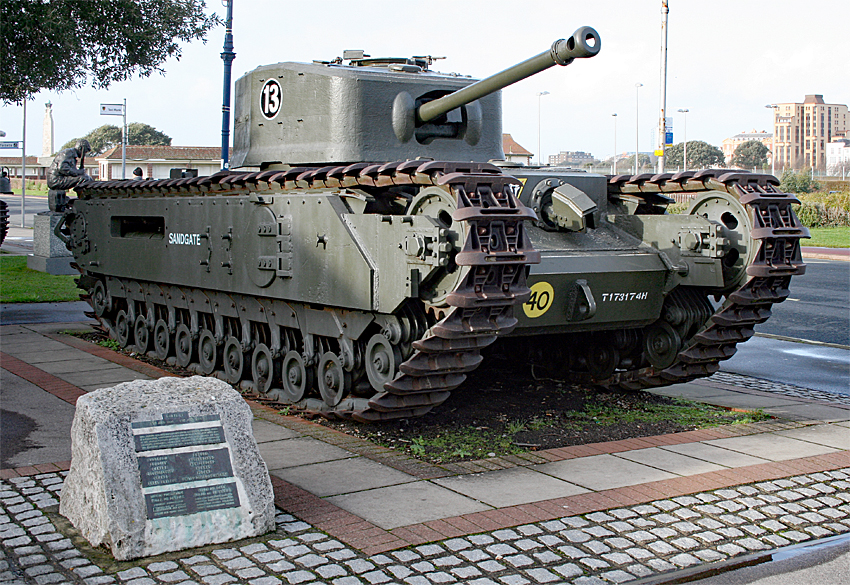
Churchill infantry tank was one of the heaviest (most armoured) allied tanks of world war II

- Tank, Infantry, Mk.I, Matilda I
- Tank, Infantry, Mk.II, Matilda II
- Tank, Infantry, Mk.III Valentine
- Tank, Infantry, Mk.IV, Churchill
- Tank, Infantry, Valiant – prototype only.
- Infantry Tank Black Prince – prototype only.

=== Other tanks ===
- "Tank, Heavy Assault, A33 (Excelsior)" – prototype only
- Tortoise heavy assault tank – prototype only
- Tank, Heavy TOG 1 – prototype only
- Tank, Heavy TOG 2 – prototype only

=== Self-propelled guns ===
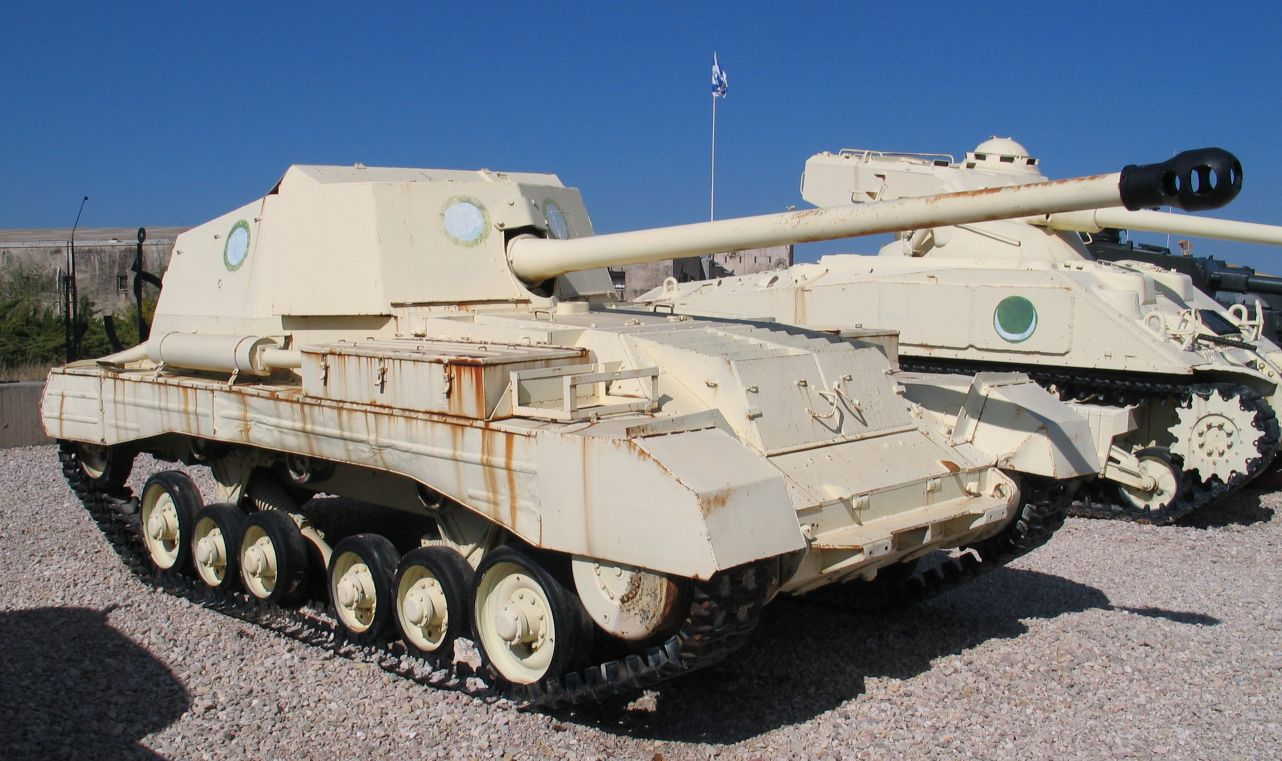
Archer was a powerful 17-pounder anti-tank gun on Valentine chassis

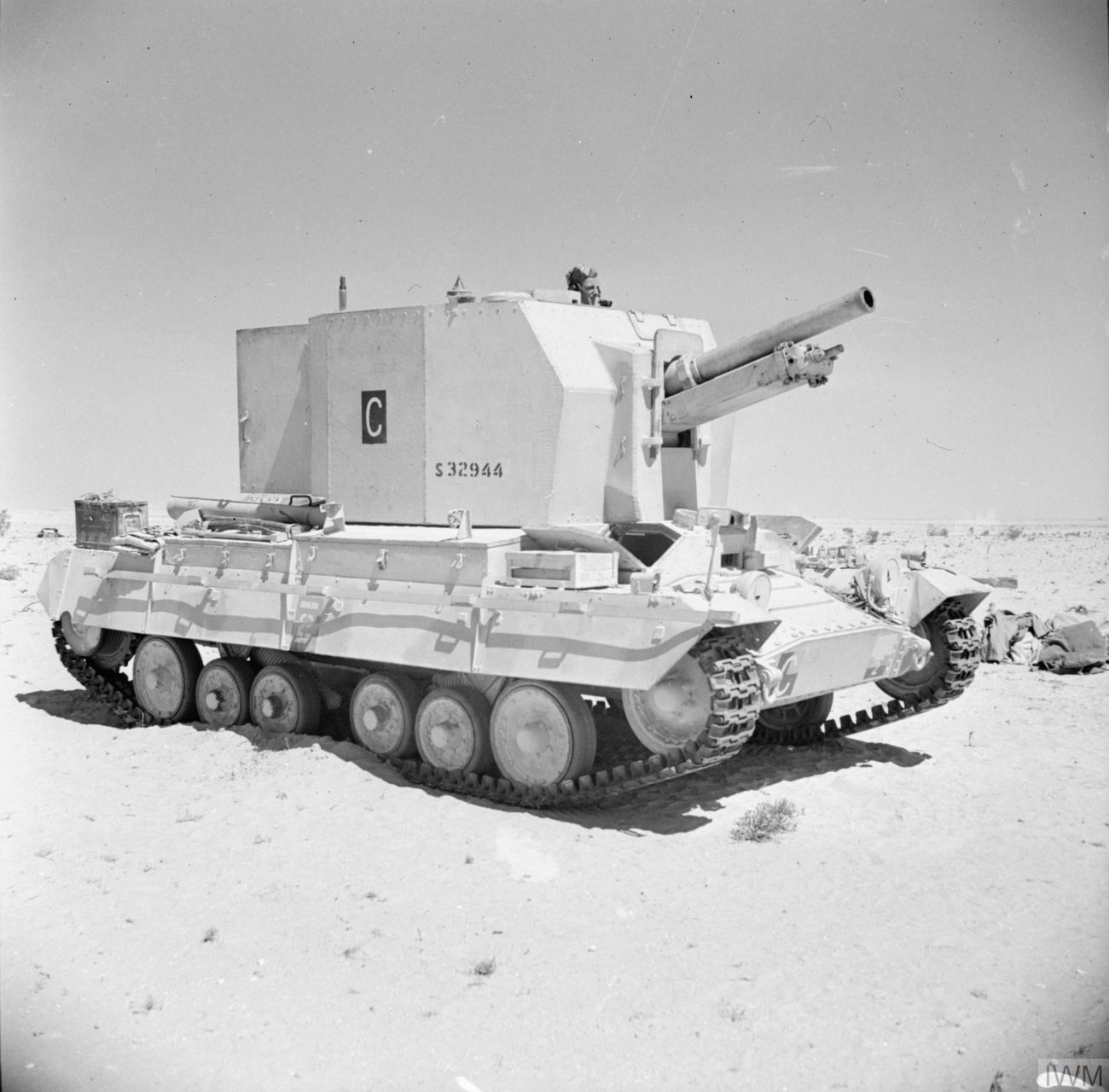
Bishop was a 25-pounder gun mounted on a Valentine chassis

- 25-pdr SP, tracked, Sexton
- Self Propelled 17pdr, Valentine, Mk I, Archer
- 3inch Self Propelled M10 – Gun Motor Carriage M10, provided under lend-lease from America.
  - 17pdr Self propelled M10C – M10 rearmed with 17-pdr gun
- AEC Mk I Gun Carrier "Deacon" – 6pdr on armoured wheeled chassis
- Carrier, Valentine, 25-pdr gun, Mk.I, Bishop – interim design for 25 pdr on tank chassis
- SP 17-pdr, A30 (Avenger) – variant of Cruiser Challenger tank, not delivered to army until post-war.
- 105 mm SP, Priest – 105 mm Howitzer Motor Carriage M7, provided under lend-lease from America.
- M3 Gun Motor Carriage – provided under lend-lease from America. In British service designated "75 mm SP, Autocar".
- T48 Gun Motor Carriage – 680 provided by lend-lease from America. Many had gun removed to convert them back to armoured personnel carriers.
- M14 and M13 Multiple Gun Motor Carriage – provided by lend-lease from America. Many had guns removed to convert them back to armoured personnel carriers.

=== Other armoured fighting vehicles ===
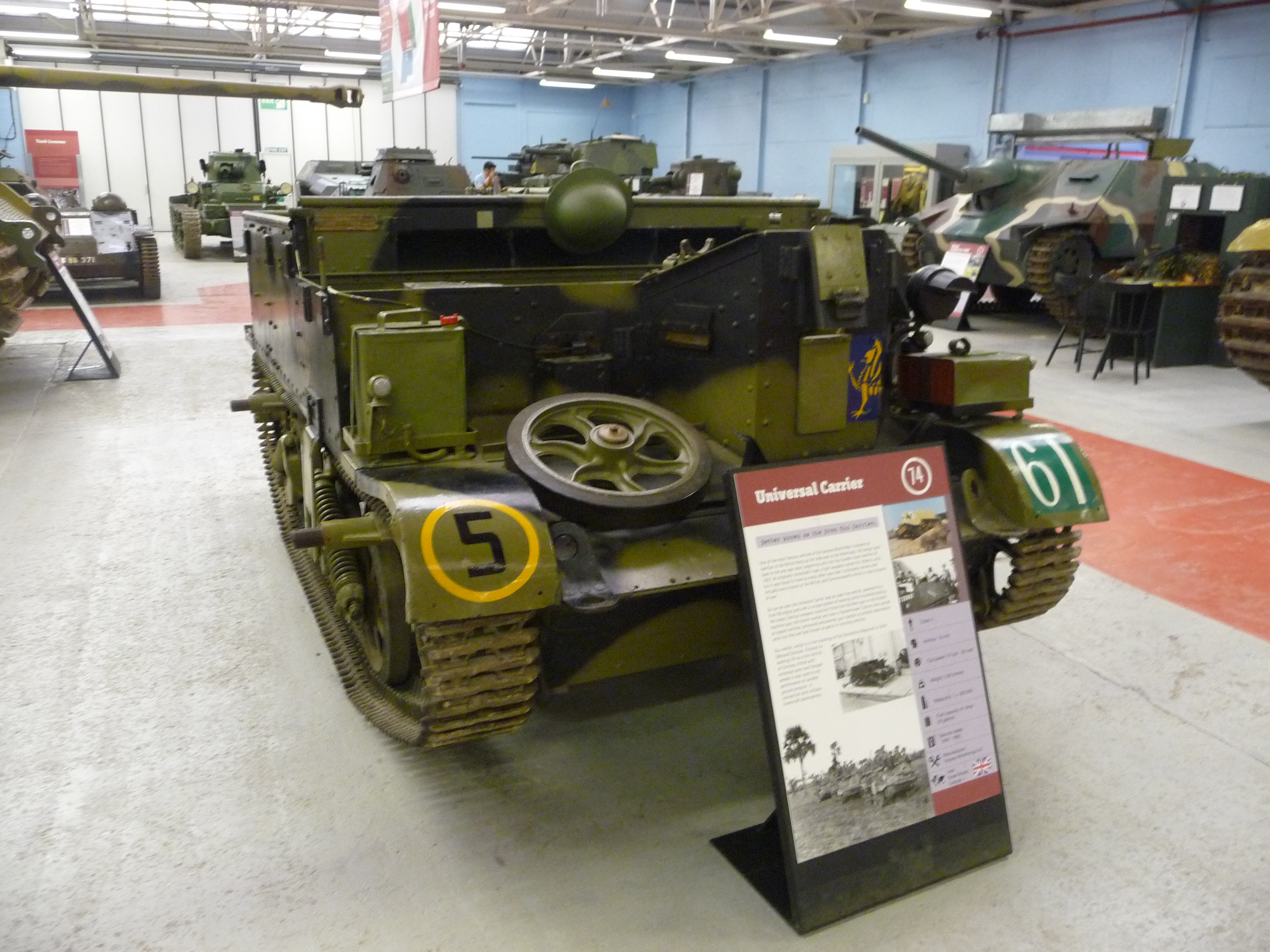
Universal carrier which was British personnel carrier that served from 1940 through all of the war

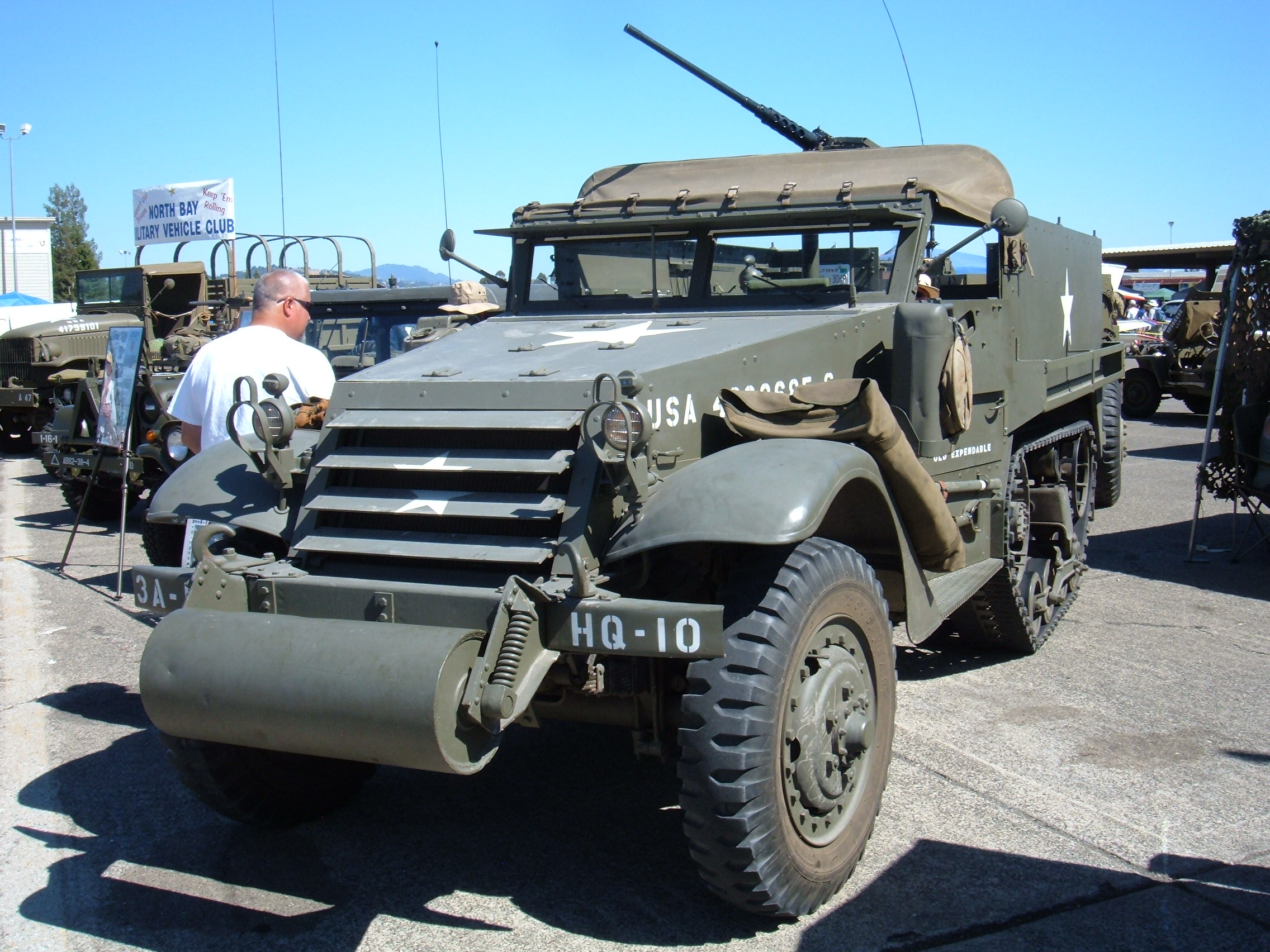
M3 Half track used as personnel carrier and provided to British forces through lend-lease

- Universal Carrier
- Loyd Carrier
- Half-track Car M2 – Provided under lend-lease by US.
- Half-track Personnel Carrier M3 – Provided under lend-lease by US.
- Half-track Personnel Carrier M5 – Provided under lend-lease by US. effectively same as M3
- Half-track Personnel Carrier M9 – Provided under lend-lease by US. effectively same as M5 for same role as M2
- 4-ton amphibian, Terrapin – amphibious personnel and cargo carrier

=== Utility vehicles ===
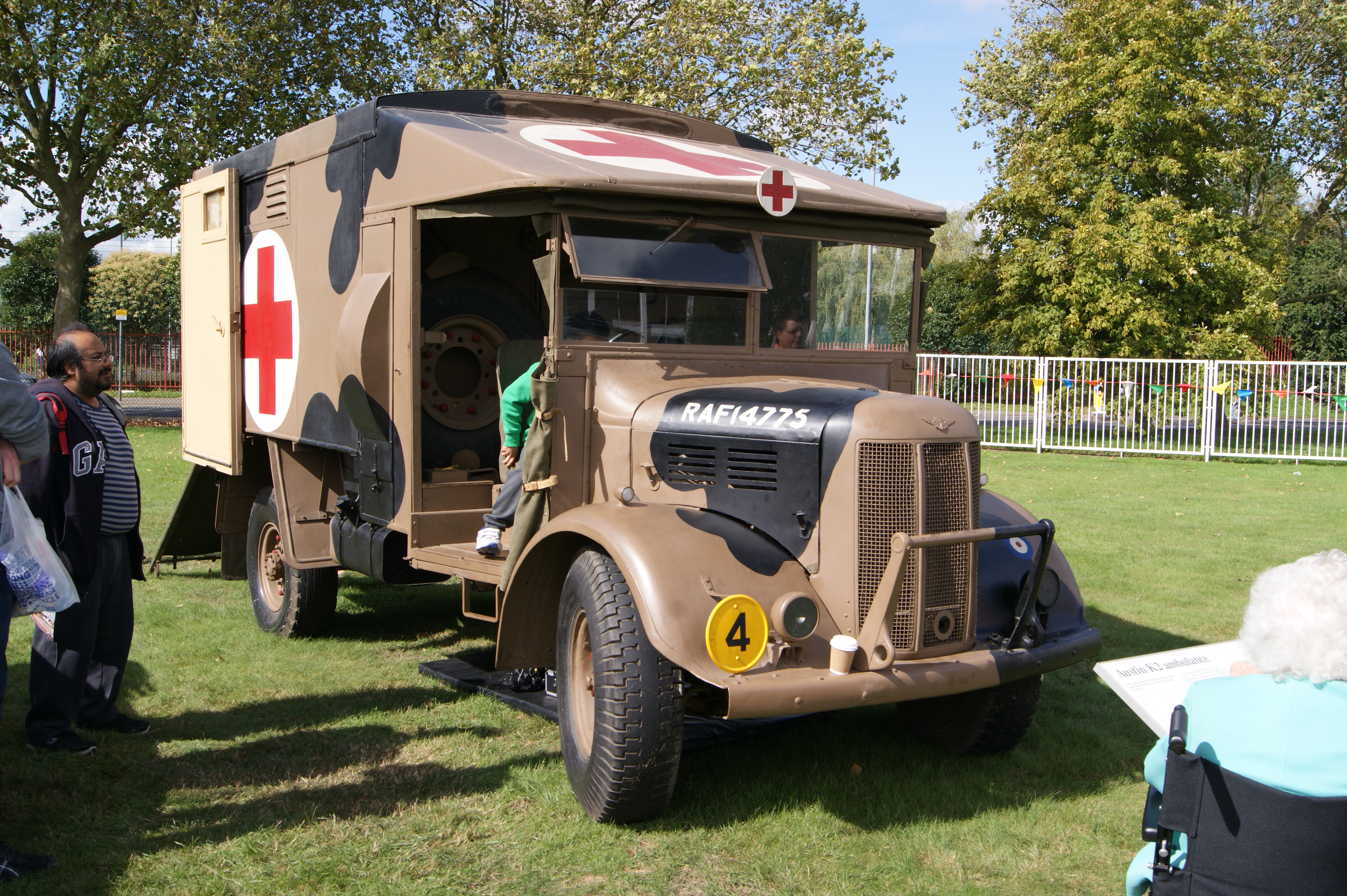
Austin K2/Y military ambulance

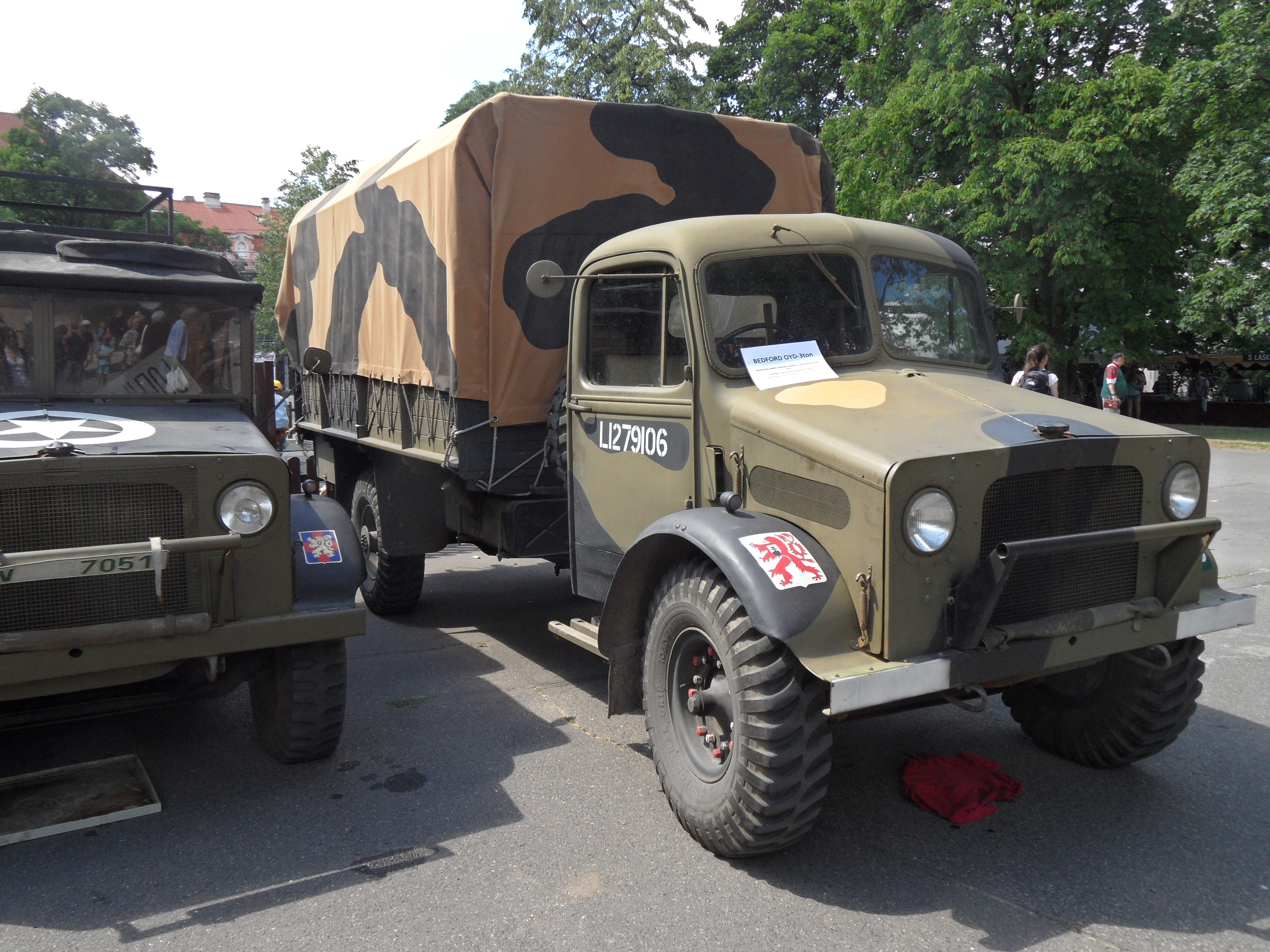
Bedford OYD general service transport for troops and cargo

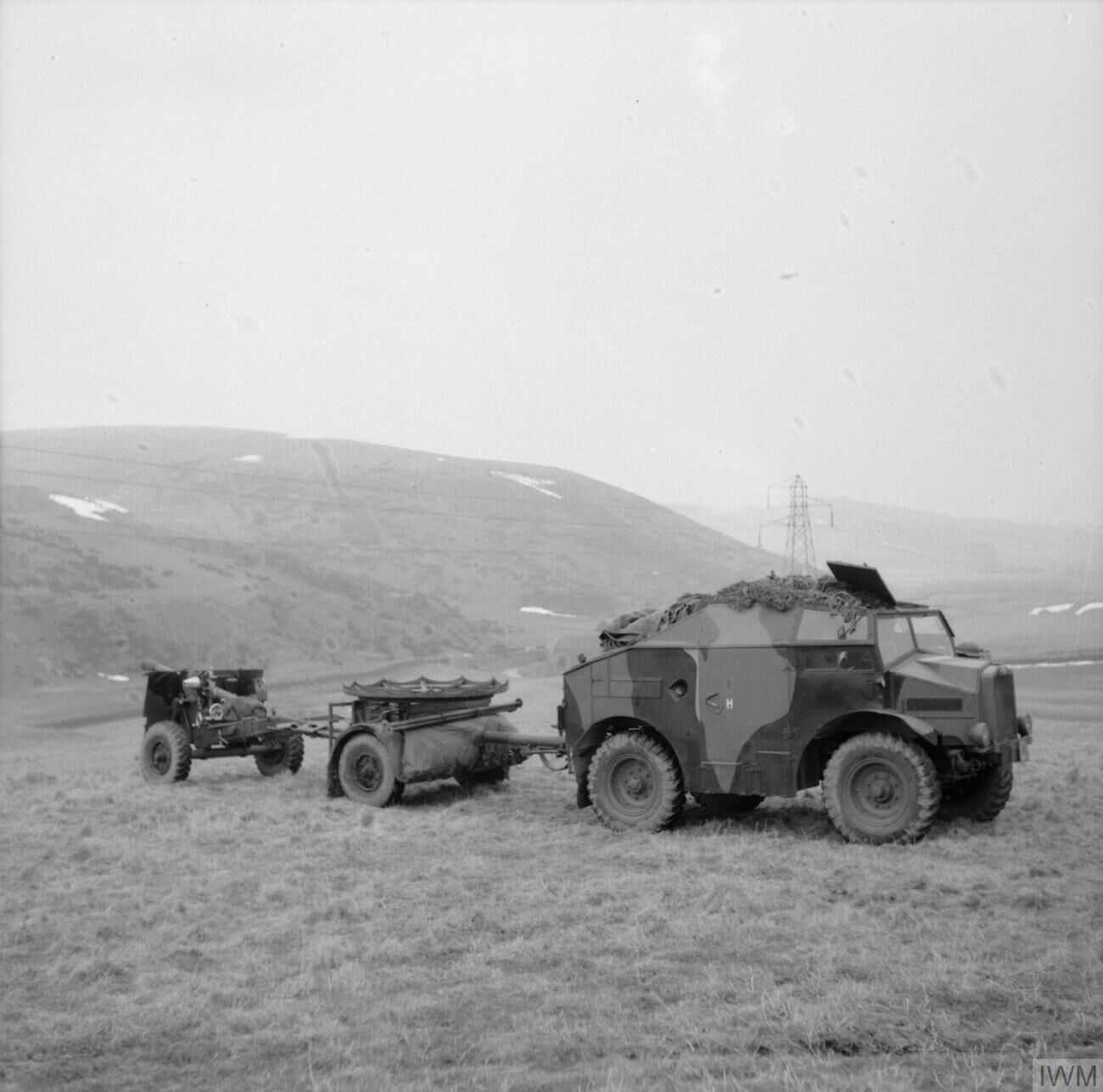
Morris C8 Quad field artillery tractor with 25pdr gun and limber

- AEC Matador – 4x4 truck and artillery tractor
- Albion CX22S – heavy 6x4 artillery tractor
- Austin K2/Y – military ambulance
- Austin K5 – heavy truck
- Bedford MW – general service truck
- Bedford OY – a series of trucks
- BSA M20 – motorcycle
- Canadian Military Pattern truck – general grouping of Canadian-built trucks by various manufacturers to common specification
  - Chevrolet C8A – Canadian-built truck
- Ford C11ADF – light truck
- Leyland Hippo Mk I – heavy 6x4 general service truck
- Leyland Hippo Mk II – heavy 6x4 general service truck
- Leyland Retriever 6x4 truck
- Morris C8 – "Quad" field artillery tractor
- Morris CDSW – 6x4 artillery tractor
- Queen Mary trailer – trailer for transport of aircraft and aircraft sections
- Scammell Pioneer – heavy 6x4 tractor unit
- Standard light utility
- Tilly (vehicle) – "Tilly", utility versions of civilian cars.
- Willys MB – Willys Jeep

=== Motorcycles ===
- BSA M20
- Norton 16H
- Royal Enfield WD/RE – lightweight motorcycle
- Welbike – small motorcycle intended for parachute drop

== Aerial bombs ==
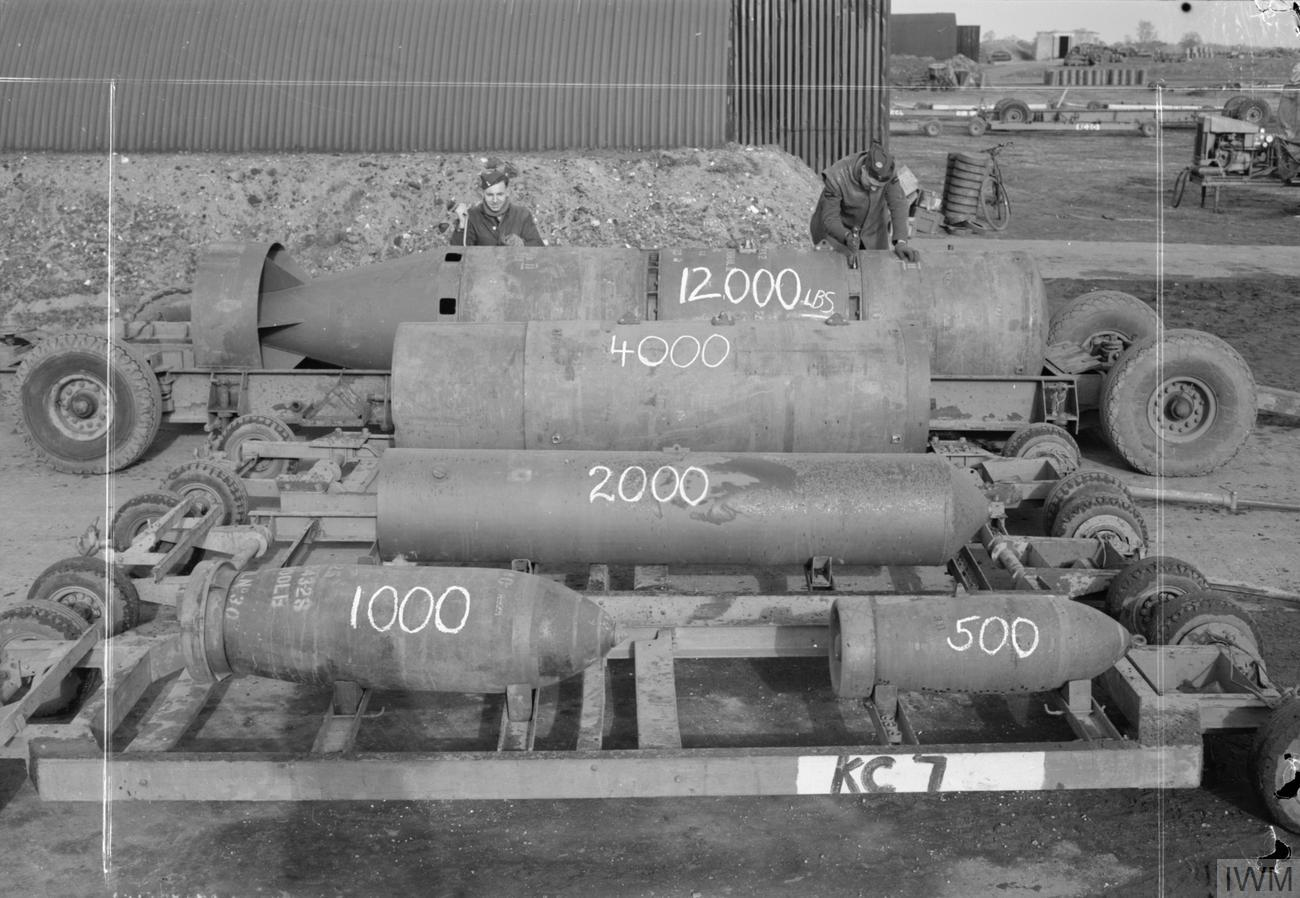
British aerial bombs: 2000lb, 4000lb and 12000lb blockbusters, 1000lb and 500lb GP bombs

- Fire balloons
- "Bouncing bombs"
  - Upkeep
  - Highball
- Gas bombs
- Smoke bombs
- Tallboy bomb
- Grand Slam bomb
- Blockbuster bombs
- Disney bomb

== See also ==
- List of British military equipment of World War II
- World War II armoured fighting vehicles of the United Kingdom
- World War II military equipment of the United Kingdom topics
