= A.P. Shrapnel Mine =

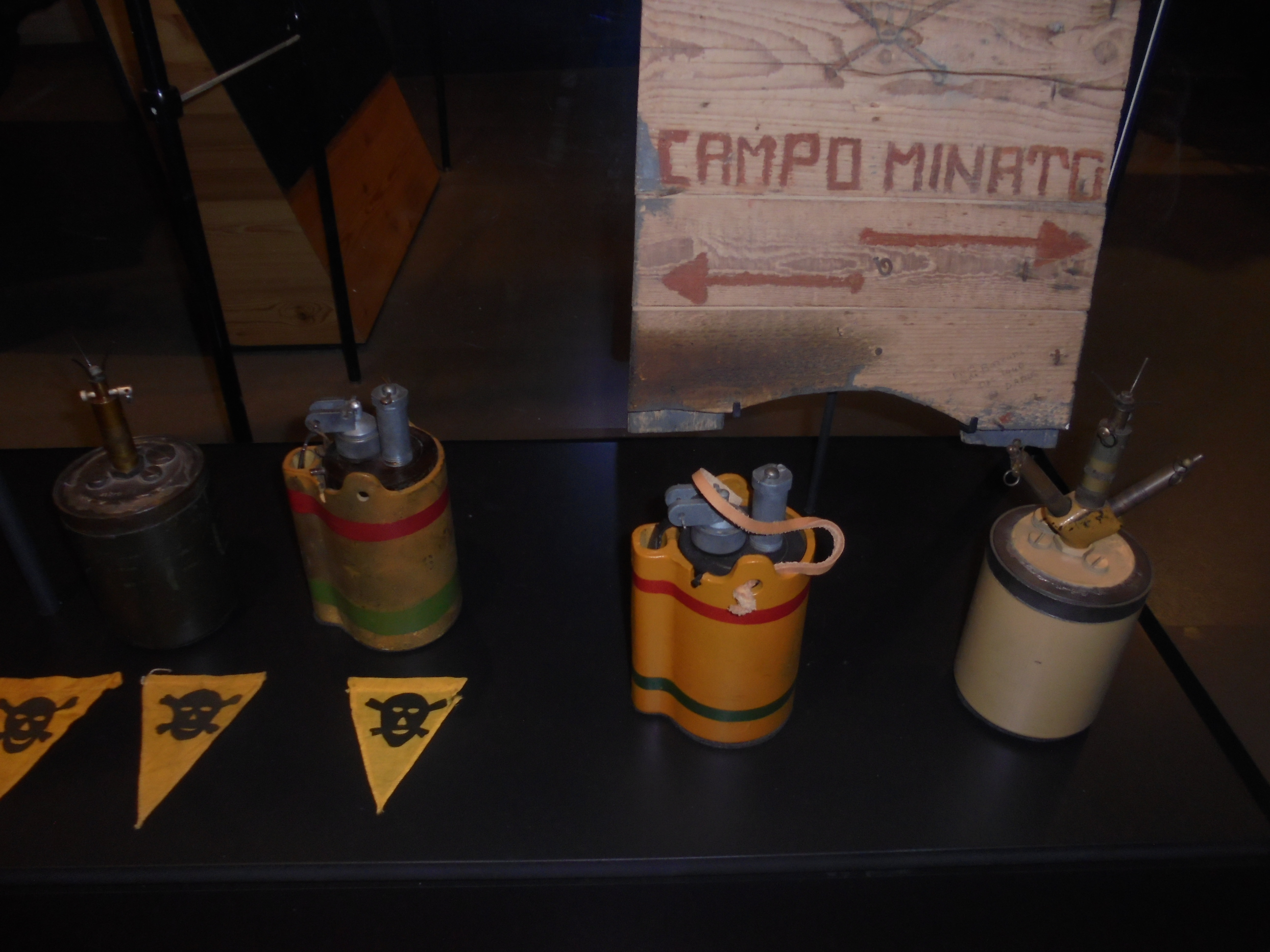
- In the middle of this image are two A.P. Shrapnel Mines flanked by two S-mines
- Type: Bounding mine
- Place of origin: United Kingdom

Service history
- Used by: United Kingdom
- Wars: World War II

Production history
- Variants: Mark I and II

Specifications
- Mass: 10 lb (4.5 kg)
- Height: 5.5 in (140 mm)
- Diameter: 3.5 in (89 mm)
- Filling: Amatol
- Filling weight: 1 lb (0.45 kg)

The A.P. (anti-personnel) Shrapnel Mine is a British bounding mine of World War II.

== Design ==
=== Parts ===
The mines have cylindrical outer and inner cases as well as two pistol mechanisms. The cartridge pistol mechanism is for triggering the propellant charge that was used to launch the trigger charge, for the main explosive charge in the inner case, into the air from the outer case and the detonator pistol mechanism, which detonated the trigger charge of the mine mid-air thereby triggering the main explosive charge. Both marks of the mine have their sole activation trigger in the form of a tripwire.

=== Detonation process ===
Putting 4 pounds of pulling force (1.8 kilograms) on the tripwire activates the mine by detaching the cartridge pistol trip plate. This results in a striker in the mine penetrating the propellant charge through a striker spring acting on the striker as a result of the trip plate detaching from the cartridge pistol. The penetrated propellant charge which is a Ballistite cartridge then explodes launching the inner case containing the trigger charge into the air. On the inner case leaving the outer case the inner case starts to be activated by the freeing of the lever arm. This leads to a striker in detonated pistol to be released which then penetrates the trigger charge of the mine which detonates triggering the main explosive charge of one pound of Amatol which explodes breaking apart the steel case of the mine and turning the steel pieces into high-velocity shrapnel which was supposed to cause casualties in a 30-yard (27 meter) radius.

=== Arming and disarming ===
A.P. shrapnel mines are armed by removing two transit screws attaching the inner and outer casing. The cartridge pistol, which is a thin cylinder protruding out of the mine, is then unscrewed using a spanner. Once that is complete, the Ballistite cartridge that is used to propel the mine into the air can be inserted. Reversing the process used to remove it, the cartridge pistol is then securely re-inserted into the mine. Next, the detonator pistol, which is a shorter and wider cylinder than the cartridge pistol, is removed and replaced with the detonator. The larger part of the detonator must face away from the mine body. The detonator pistol is then re-inserted, and the lever arm is secured in a hollow on the side of the mine. Once this has been inserted, the mine is placed in position for use and the tripwire is attached to the trip plate on the cartridge pistol. The other end of the tripwire is then secured to another surface to create a straight, horizontal tripwire to detonate the mine. The safety pins on both pistols are then removed. These are in place throughout the whole of the arming process to avoid accidental detonation.

To disable the mine, the safety pins are re-inserted and then the tripwire cable is cut. The detonator and Ballistite charge can then be safely removed from the cartridge and detonator pistols, rendering the mine inoperable and completely safe.

=== Variants ===
The two main variants of the A.P. Shrapnel Mine are marked I and II. There is a delay in the mark I mine that does not occur in the mark II. A leather carry strap is also present on the mark I but not on the mark II. The spring lever for the mark I mine is shorter than that of the Mark II and the space for it in the mark I mine does not go all the way down the mine.
