= PROM-1 =

Yugoslavian manufactured bounding anti-personnel mine

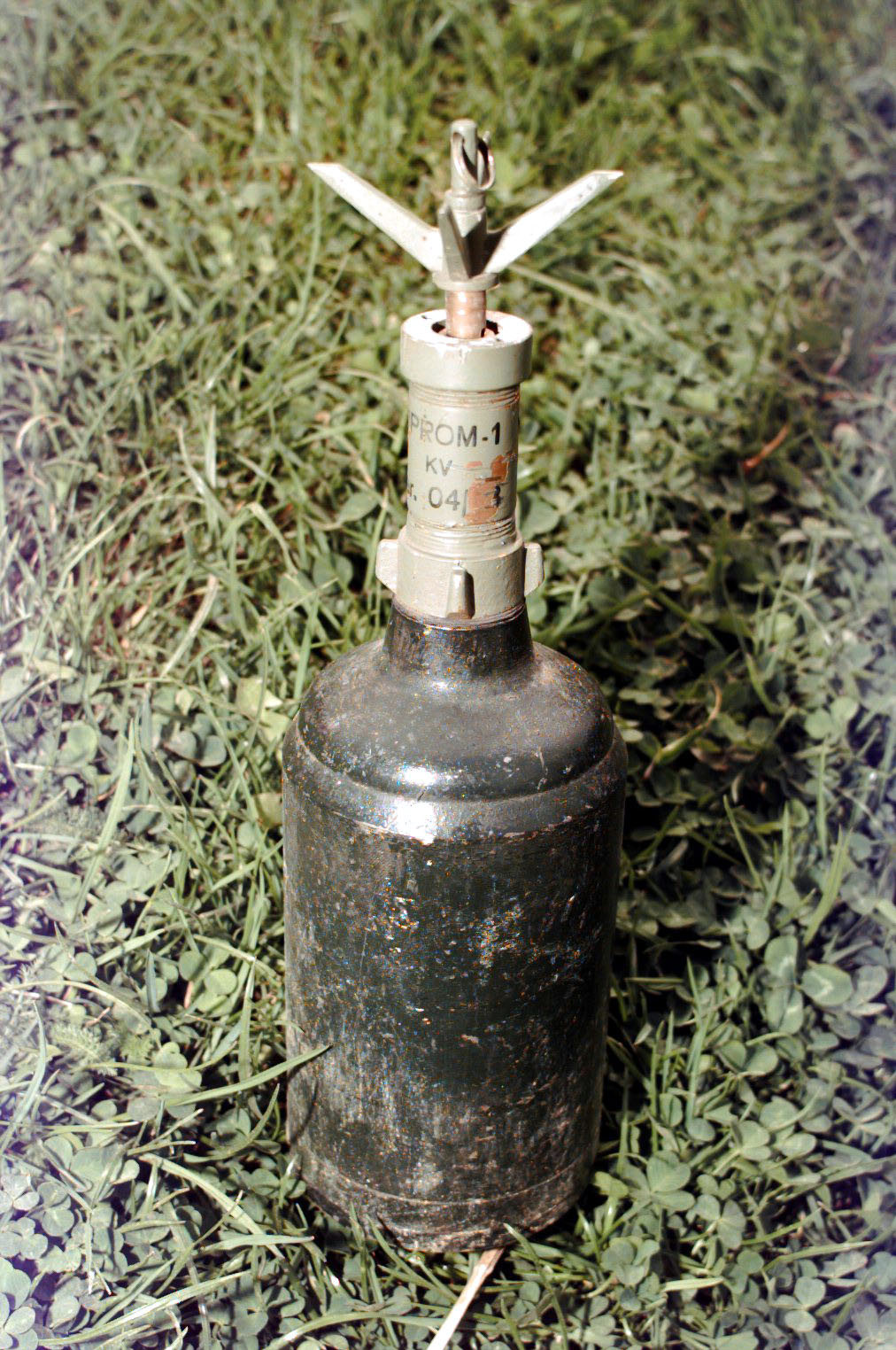
PROM-1 anti-personnel mine. Normally the mine is buried so that only the prongs are visible. The safety clip has been removed from this mine, so the fuze mechanism should be considered to be armed

The PROM-1 is a Yugoslavian manufactured bounding anti-personnel mine. It consists of a cylindrical body with a pronged fuze inserted into the top of the mine. It is broadly similar in operation to the German S-mine.

The mine is triggered by the tilting of the prongs situated on top of the mine. This is caused by either direct pressure on the prongs or by tension on a tripwire attached to them. Tilting the prongs allows at least one of three striker retaining balls to escape. This releases the spring-loaded striker, which is flipped downwards into the percussion cap and fires the three gram propellant charge. The explosion of the propellant charge forces the upper half of the mine body out of the ground and up into the air, shearing off several brass screws and leaving the base plug of the mine behind in the ground.

The mine's body is tethered to its base by a short length of wire, which unwinds behind it as it rises. When the mine reaches a height of approximately 65 centimetres the wire is pulled. This jerks the detonator assembly downwards into the striker. The detonator fires, triggering the main explosive charge, which shatters the internally grooved body into a large number of high-velocity steel fragments, which spray in all directions. Because the time taken from triggering the mine to detonation is so short (typically one second), there is no time to take cover from the blast.

As with all bounding mines the PROM-1 is lethal at relatively long distances. It is capable of projecting dangerous fragments to range of 100 metres or more, with a potentially lethal range of around 50 metres. This mine will almost certainly kill or seriously injure anyone caught within 30 metres of the blast. As with any bounding mine, wearing standard kevlar body armour offers no guarantee of safety: the large number of fragments produced by a PROM-1 will wound the unprotected limbs, face and eyes of its victim(s).

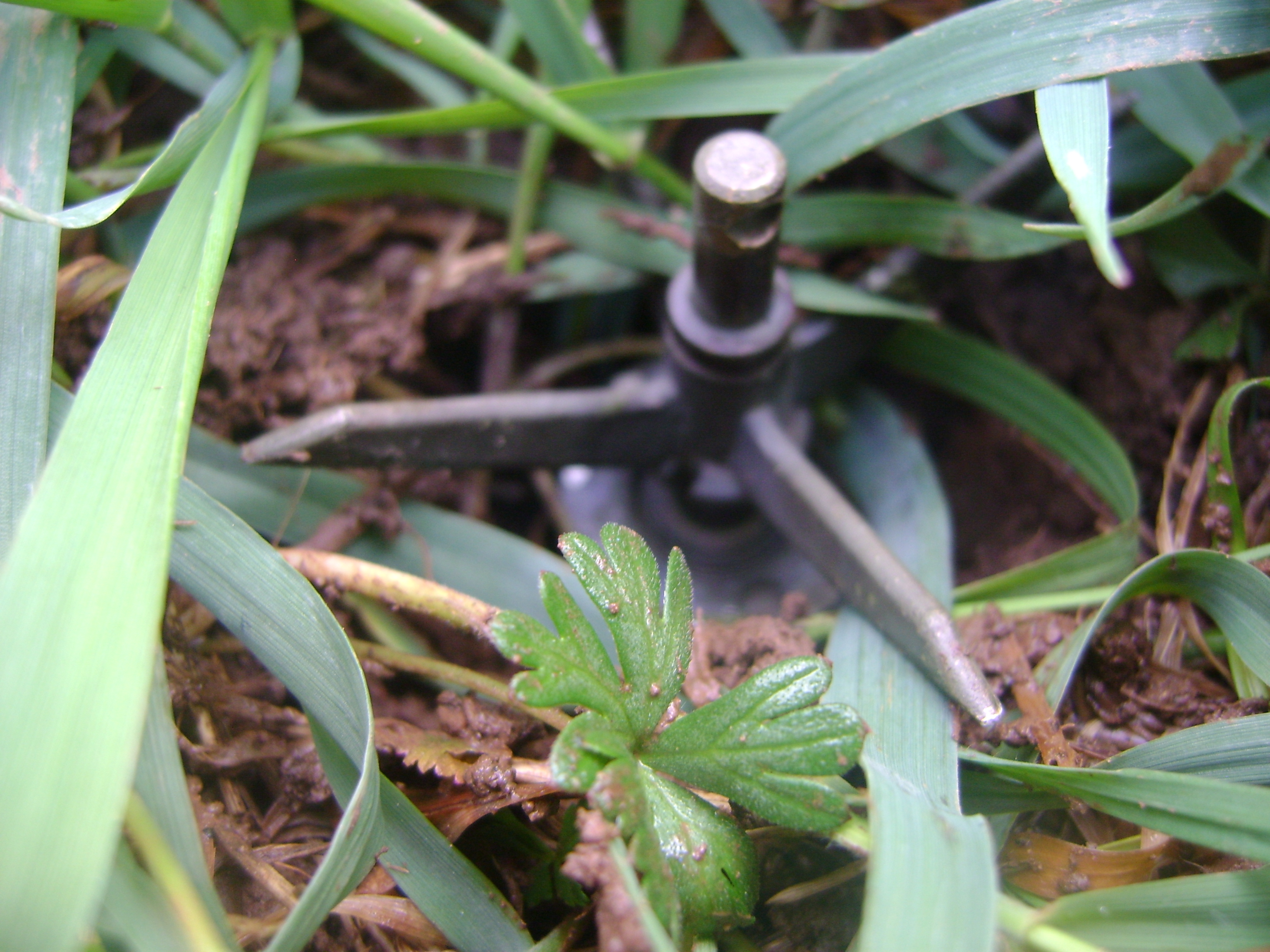
A PROM-1 which has been buried so that only the prongs of the fuze are visible. A tripwire could be connected to the central prong (which has a hole in it) to increase the activation area

The PROM-1 can be particularly hard to spot in undergrowth because, apart from the prongs, most of it is buried underground and therefore cannot be seen. Although this mine contains much steel (thereby making it easy to detect with a mine-detector) the act of sweeping the detection head over the ground can easily strike the prongs (or connected tripwire) and detonate the mine. In any case, PROM-1s in a minefield may be surrounded by various types of minimum metal antipersonnel blast mines (e.g. the VS-50) which further hinders the clearance process.

The PROM-1 is difficult to render safe because its fuze becomes unstable after being exposed to weather for several years. Most deminers therefore recommend that this mine is destroyed in situ by detonating an explosive charge next to it.

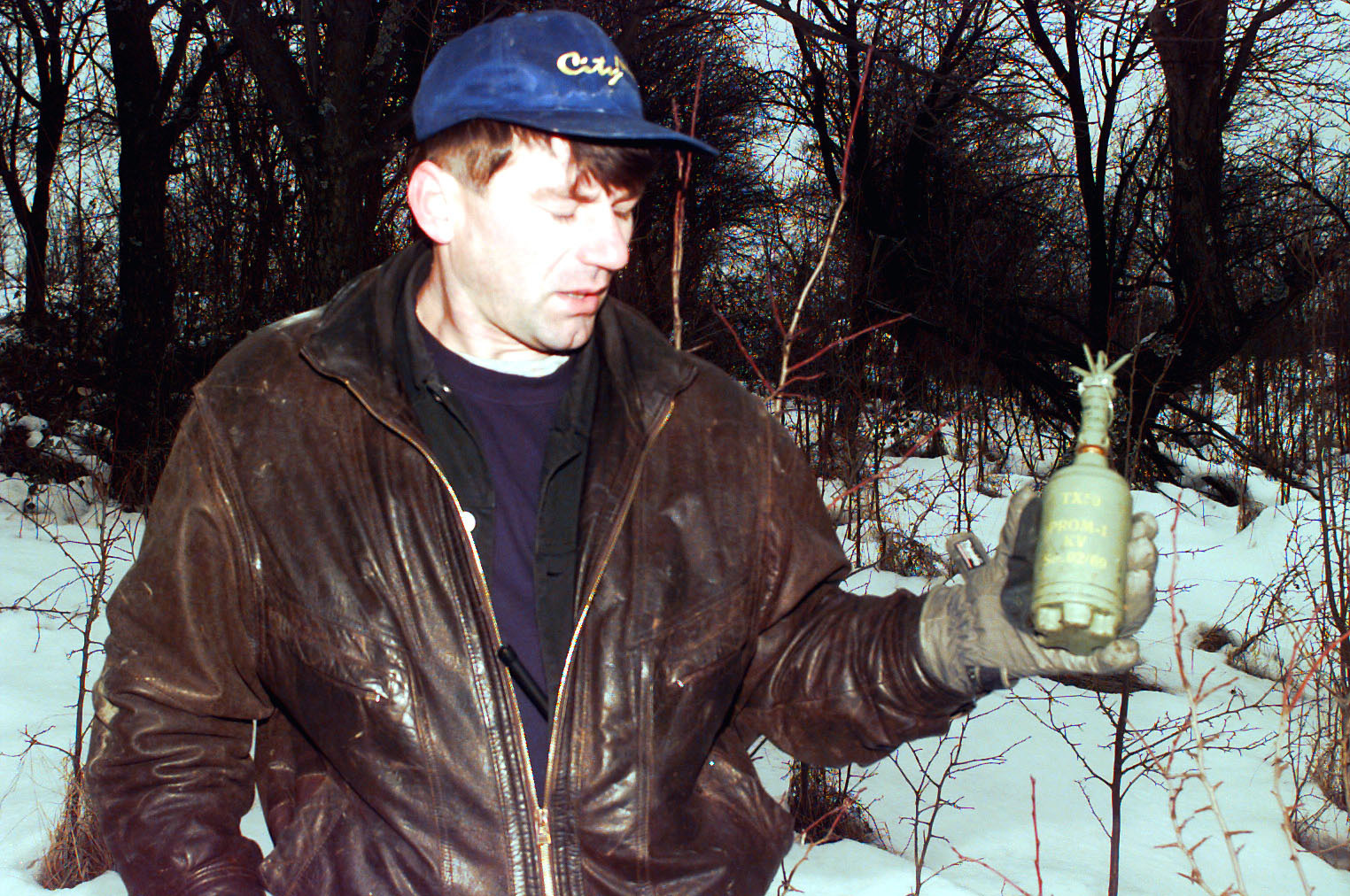
PROM-1 in the hands of a deminer. The safety clip is in place to prevent detonation.

Usually (though not always) trip-wires measuring around 20 feet (6.1 meters) in length are fitted to this mine in order to increase its activation area. When tracking trip-wires back to their source, deminers must keep in mind that other landmines may have been planted along its length. It is all too easy to concentrate on following a trip-wire back to its source, forgetting that there could be PMA-3, PMN or similar blast mines lying buried underneath.

The mine has been found in Angola, Bosnia, Chile, Croatia, Eritrea, Iraq, Kosovo, Mozambique and Namibia.

== Specifications ==
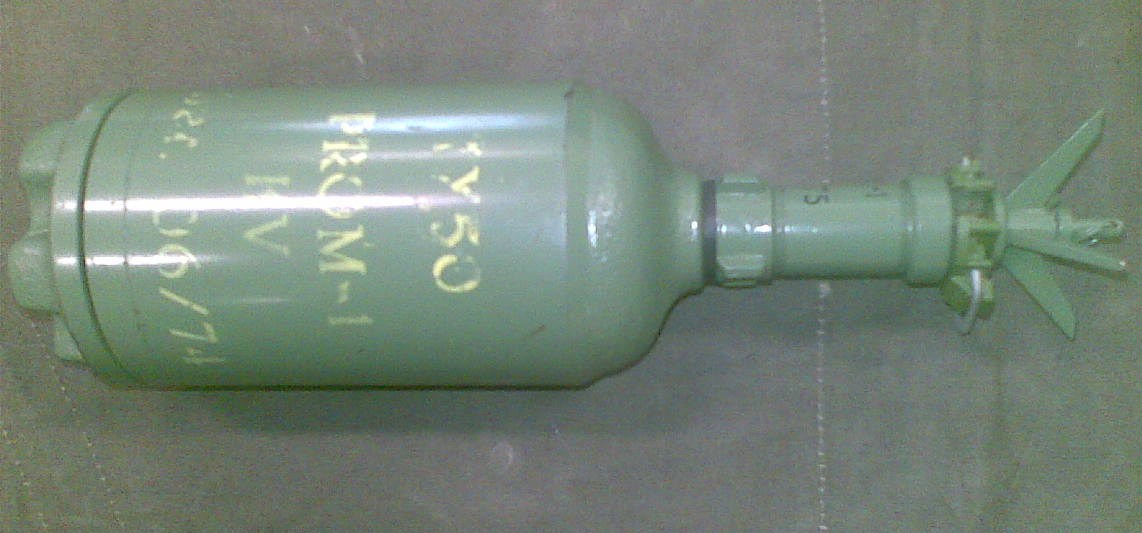
Side view of a PROM-1 mine. Note that the safety clip is in place, to prevent detonation.

- Diameter: 75 mm
- Height : 260 mm (unfuzed)
- Weight: 3 kg
- Explosive content: 425 g Composition B or straight cast TNT
- Operating pressure: 9 kg to 16 kg or 3 kg to 5 kg pull

== See also ==
- OZM
- M16 mine
- Valmara 59
- Valmara 69
- Land mine
- No Man's Land (2001 film)
- Ottawa Treaty
