= S-mine =

Bounding anti-personnel mine

S-mine 35
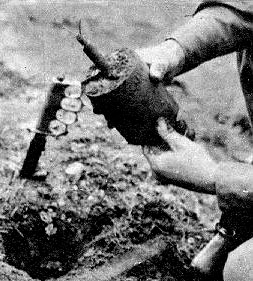
- An American paratrooper in the process of removing a live S-mine. On the left is a Mark I trench knife.
- Type: bounding anti-personnel mine
- Place of origin: Germany

Service history
- In service: 1935–1945
- Used by: Germany, Axis powers, Finland, Viet Cong
- Wars: World War II, Winter War, Continuation War, Vietnam War

Production history
- Produced: 1935–1945
- No. built: 1,930,000+
- Variants: SMi-35, SMi-44

Specifications
- Mass: 4.1 kg (9 lb 1 oz)
- Height: 127 mm (5 in)
- Diameter: 102 mm (4 in)
- Filling: TNT
- Filling weight: 182 g (6.4 oz)
- Detonation mechanism: Various, including: S.Mi.Z 35 (pressure), Z.Z.35 (pull), Z.U.Z.Z. (pull and tension), E.S.Mi.Z (pressure and electric)

The German S-mine (Schrapnellmine, Springmine or Splittermine in German), known by enemy Allied Forces as the "Bouncing Betty" on the Western Front and "frog-mine" on the Eastern Front, is the best-known version of a class of mines known as bounding mines. When triggered, these mines are launched into the air and then detonated at about one metre (3 ft) from the ground. The explosion projects a lethal spray of shrapnel in all directions. The S-mine was an anti-personnel mine developed by Germany in the 1930s and used extensively by German forces during World War II. It was designed to be used in open areas against unshielded infantry. Two versions were produced, designated by the year of their first production: the SMi-35 and SMi-44. There are only minor differences between the two models.

The S-mine entered production in 1935 and served as a key part of the defensive strategy of the Wehrmacht. Until production ceased in 1945, Germany produced over 1.93 million S-mines. These mines inflicted heavy casualties and slowed, or even repelled, drives into German-held territory throughout the war. The design was lethal, successful, and often imitated.

== History ==
French soldiers encountered the S-mine during minor probes into the German Saar region on 7–11 September 1939, during the Saar Offensive. The S-mine contributed to the withdrawal of these French incursions. The mine's performance in the Saar region affirmed its effectiveness in the eyes of the German leadership and prompted the United States and other countries to copy its design. After their experience, the French nicknamed the mine "the silent soldier".

Nazi Germany used the S-mine heavily during the defense of its occupied territories and the German homeland during the Allied invasions of Europe and North Africa. The mines were produced in large numbers and planted liberally by defending German units. For example, the German Tenth Army deployed over 23,000 of them as part of their defense preparation during the Allied invasion of Italy.

S-mines were deployed on the beaches of Normandy in preparation for the anticipated invasion as part of a general program of heavy mining and fortification. On the Îles-St.-Marcouf, just off Utah Beach, where Allied planners believed the Germans had established heavy gun batteries, Erwin Rommel had ordered S-mines to be "sown like grass seed." To build the Atlantic Wall, Germans laid millions of mines of various types including anti-personnel mines such as the S-mine, dug hundreds of kilometers of trenches, laid barbed wire, and constructed thousands of beach obstacles. The mines were subsequently used to defend German positions during the Battle of Normandy and in the defense of Northern France and the German border. S-mines were typically used in combination with anti-tank mines to resist the advances of both armor and infantry. The Allies removed an estimated 15,000 unexploded mines from dunes by Pouppeville after the initial invasion.

The S-mine acquired its alliterative nickname "Bouncing Betty" from American infantrymen. The S-mine had a great psychological effect on Allied forces because of its tendency to maim, rather than kill, infantry. The German habit of laying them around anti-tank and anti-vehicle mines contributed to the S-mine's reputation. If a vehicle was disabled by a mine, the soldiers would be trapped in it until someone came to rescue them. Limbs and genitalia were particularly vulnerable. In his book Mine Warfare on Land, Lt. Col. Sloan described the S-mine as "probably the most feared device encountered by Allied troops in the war." Exact death tolls inflicted by the S-mine are not known. The Allies did not record whether a death was caused by a particular type of weapon, only whether or not the death occurred in the course of battle. Regardless, some unofficial assessments credit the S-mine with having caused significant casualties. The 12th Infantry Regiment at Utah Beach suffered what it termed as "light" casualties in the landing, most of which were caused by S-mines.

S-mine production ceased after the end of World War II. No information has been discovered as to the exact fate of the remaining stockpiles of the S-mine, but it can be assumed a majority were destroyed as part of the disarmament of Germany after its surrender, although possibly some were preserved for study and reverse engineering by the Allies. Many direct imitations of the S-mine appeared in the years following World War II.

During the military occupation of Germany and the postwar rebuilding of Europe, the American Army Corps of Engineers, the newly established French government, and the British Ministry of Defence engaged in one of the most prolonged and successful mine-clearing operations throughout Western Europe. France deployed a variety of personnel, including 49,000 German prisoners of war. This joint operation eliminated a majority of the remaining fields of mines on the war-torn western half of the continent and was greatly assisted by the German policy of clearly marking and accurately recording the locations of minefields.

Incidents involving accidental explosions of mines in North Africa, former Warsaw Pact countries, France, and Germany still occur sporadically. North Africa and Eastern Europe have a particularly large amount of uncleared World War II-era minefields. While German documentation stated that the S-mine had an effective lifespan of two to seven years once planted, the explosive charge may remain dangerous indefinitely.

== Characteristics ==
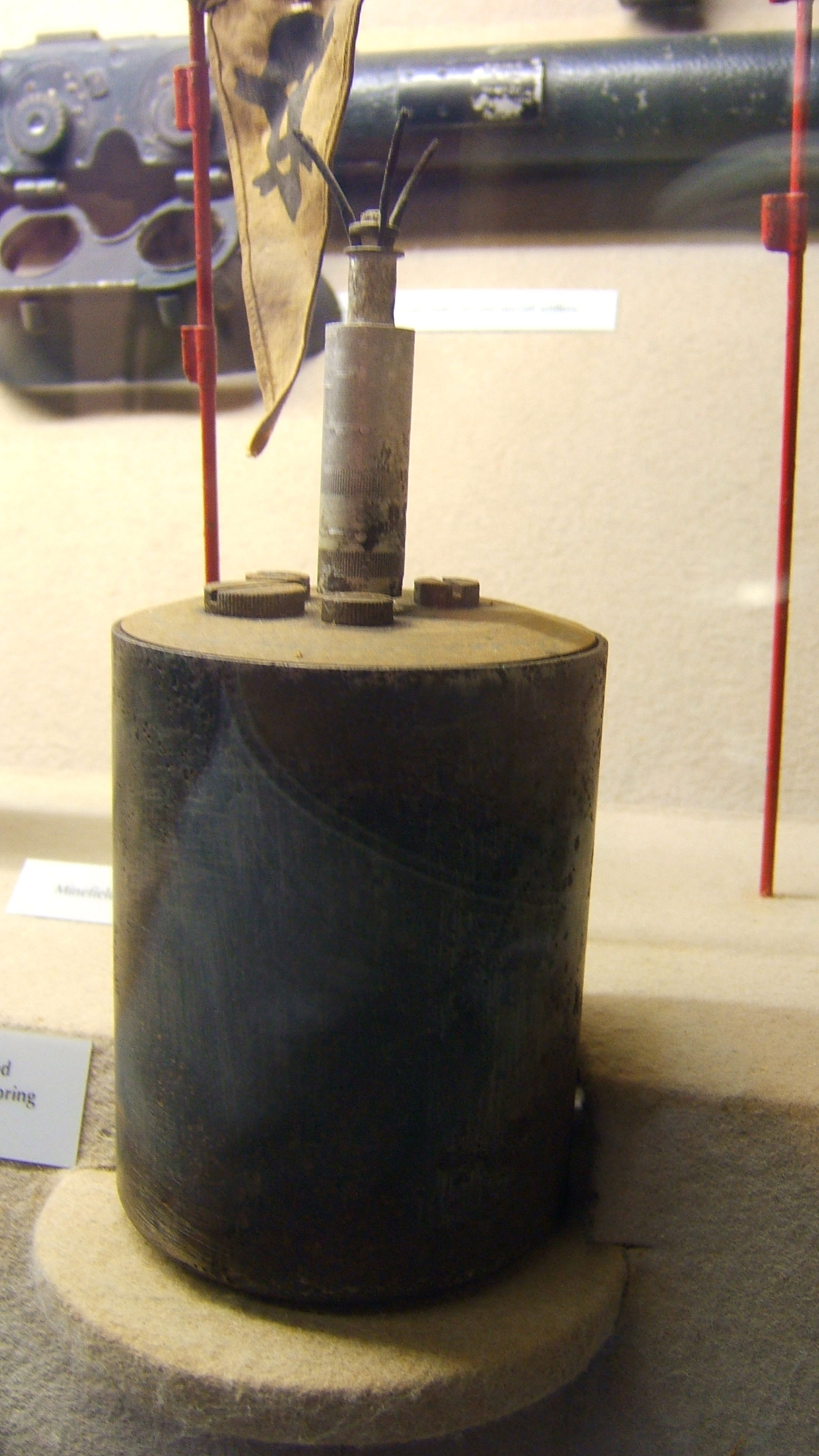
S-mine in a museum

The German S-mine was a steel cylinder approximately 15 centimetres (5.9 in) tall without its sensor and around 10 centimetres (4 in) in diameter. A steel rod protruding from the mine's top held the main fuse, where its trigger or sensor was attached. The SMi-35 had a central fuse, while the SMi-44 had an offset fuse. It weighed approximately 4 kilograms (8.8 lb), with the weight depending on whether it was loaded with the lighter powdered or the heavier poured TNT.

The main charge of the mine used TNT as its explosive; the propelling charge was black powder. The standard pressure sensor used a percussion cap to ignite it.

The main fuse was designed to delay the firing of the propelling charge for approximately four seconds after the mine was triggered. The explosion of the propelling charge sent the mine upwards into the air and activated three short-delay pellets between the propellant charge and the three detonators. These short-delay pellets delayed the mine's detonation long enough for it to reach an appropriate height before exploding.

The standard pressure sensor was designed to activate if depressed by a force equivalent to a weight of roughly seven kilograms (15 lb) or greater. This ensured the mine was not detonated by wildlife or natural impact of blowing leaves, branches, or other normally occurring phenomena.

== Usage ==
Diagram of S-mine detonation

The S-mine was normally triggered by a three-pronged pressure fuse, but the German army also provided a special tripwire adapter. The steel tube that held the fuse was threaded to accept any standard German ignition or trigger, allowing the sensor to be removed and the mine to be deliberately triggered by a human operator. When triggered, the mine functioned in three stages (see diagram).

1. First, the mine was fired 0.9 to 1.5 meters (3 to 5 ft) upwards by a small propellant charge.
2. Approximately a half-second later, the main charge detonated at the optimum height to kill or severely injure anyone in the immediate area.
3. The main charge of the mine was surrounded by roughly 360 steel balls, short steel rods, or scrap metal pieces. These became metal shrapnel that sprayed horizontally from the mine at high velocity.

The time between triggering and ignition of the propelling charge varied between 3.9 and 4.5 seconds, depending on the age and condition of the mine. According to German documentation, the S-mine was lethal within 20 meters (66 ft) and could inflict casualties within 100 meters (330 ft). American training manuals warned of casualties at up to 140 meters (460 ft).

A common misconception prevailed that the S-mine would not detonate until its victim stepped off the trigger. This fallacy was propagated by incorrect United States propaganda during World War II. The mine would detonate whether the trigger was released or not. Standing still or attempting to run from the S-mine would be equally dangerous. The most effective way to survive the mine's detonation would not be to flee but to fall to the ground lying face down as quickly as possible.

=== Armored vehicle discharger system ===
An S-mine mine launcher ("Minenabwurfvorrichtung" in German) in the form of angled tubes attached via brackets to the hull, were also used for anti-infantry defense by Wehrmacht armored vehicles. Early versions of the Tiger I were equipped with five such devices with command variants being equipped with four. Beginning in January 1943 all new Tiger Is were equipped with this system. These were removed in October 1943 and replaced in March 1944 by the Nahverteidigungswaffe or "close defense weapon" (full deployment was delayed due to production delays) which could launch anti-personnel grenades as well as smoke grenades or signal flares in all directions.

== Detection and disarming ==
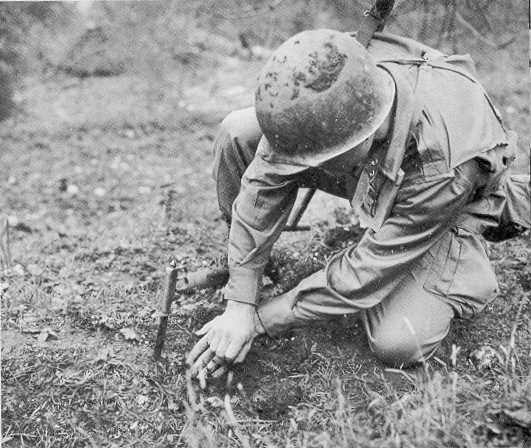
American paratrooper using a knife to probe for mines

The S-mine was constructed mostly of metal, so it could be easily detected by metal detectors. However, such expensive and bulky equipment was rarely available to infantry units and was prone to malfunction. Instead, S-mines were detected through careful manual probing, a time-consuming process. Using a knife or a bayonet, an infantryman would probe at a low angle through the soil. It was important to probe at an angle that would not accidentally depress the pressure sensor.

Once an S-mine was discovered, disarming it was fairly simple. To prevent triggering while the mine was being planted, the German pressure sensor featured a hole where a safety pin kept the sensor from being depressed. This pin was removed once the mine was planted. If the discovered mine was fitted with the pressure sensor, the disarming personnel would slip a pin (such as a sewing needle) into this hole. If the device was armed with a tripwire or electrical trigger, this could be cut. Germans were known to use booby traps to discourage this, so caution was suggested. The mine could then be removed carefully from the ground and the sensor easily unscrewed. If it was deemed necessary to render the mine completely inert, three plugs on the top granted access to the three detonators inside the mine. These could be unscrewed and the detonators removed.

== Internal components ==
The following diagrams show the SMi-35 mine's internal mechanism, together with the three-pronged pressure fuse. The safety pin for the fuse and the three removable plugs for the detonators are clearly visible. These diagrams were issued as part of a US Army field manual on mines in 1943.

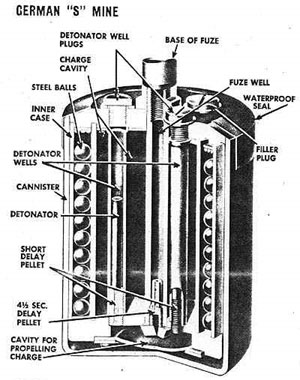
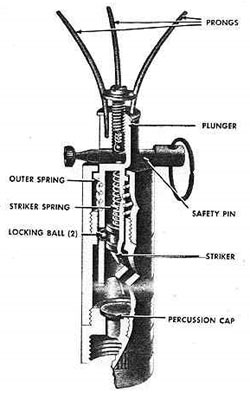

== Imitations ==
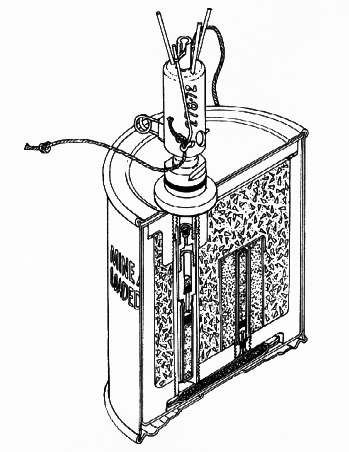
Cutaway American M16A2 bounding mine, developed from the S-mine

The S-mine was an extremely successful design. Bouncing mines based on its design were introduced by other countries.

The Finnish army began purchasing the SMi-35 model S-mine from Germany following the Winter War. This was part of a larger military assistance agreement between the two nations. Finnish forces experienced great success with the S-mine, but its monetary cost was considerable. During the Continuation War, the Finns unsuccessfully attempted to produce their own version of the mine. The Finnish nickname for the mine was Hyppy-Heikki ("Hopping Henry").

The French Mle 1939 mine was inspired by the success of the S-mine. In 1940, Major Pierre (also cited as Paul) Delalande of the French Corps of Engineers managed to escape the German conquest of his country and reached the United States with the Mle-1939 plans. These plans led to the development of the American M2 mine, which was fielded in 1942 but proved deficient in combat. The American army was impressed by the S-mine's role in thwarting the French offensive in the German Saar region at the beginning of World War II and continued further work on bounding mines. After the war, the American army developed their M16 mine directly from captured S-mine designs.

The Soviet Union also based the design of its OZM series of mines on the German S-mine. Soviet mines tended to be far simpler internally; instead of being filled with steel balls or scrap metal, the OZM-4 mine was given a solid cast-iron body that would fragment on its own. Later, the OZM-72 bounding mine was filled with steel rods, returning to the original concept of the S-mine. Both of these mines are still being produced by Russia.

Yugoslavia also built a PROM-1 bounding type of anti-personnel mine loosely based on the S-mine. The mine was widely used during the Croatian War of Independence by both sides. The mine was also found in Bosnia, Chile, Eritrea, Iraq, Kosovo, Mozambique and Namibia.

Other nations that have produced S-mine-inspired designs include the People's Republic of China, Sweden (called Truppmina 11), and Italy.
