= A.P. Mine No. 3 =

A.P. Mine No.3
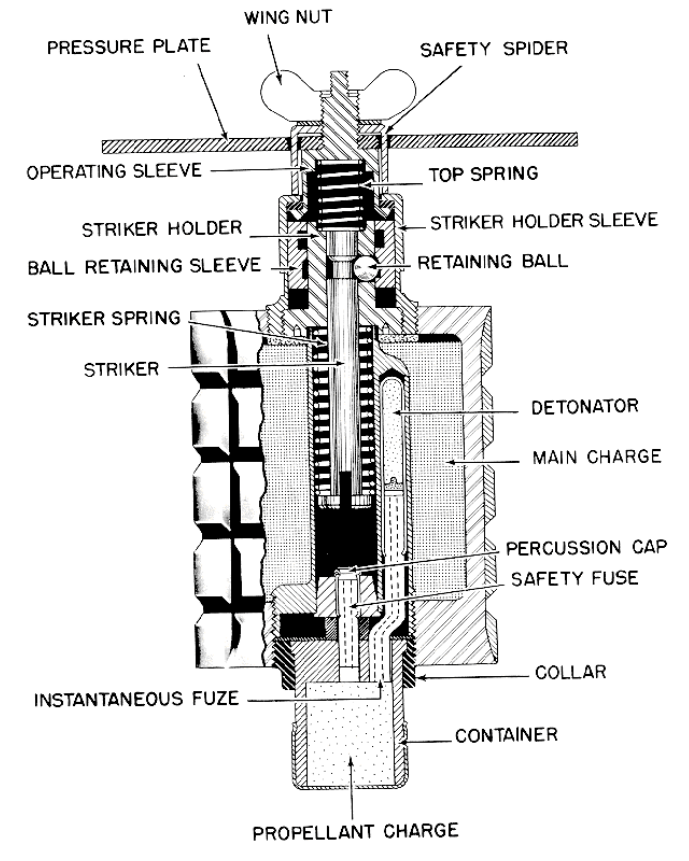
- Cross section of mine with safety and wing-nut fitted
- Type: Anti-personnel mine
- Place of origin: British India

Service history
- Used by: Great Britain
- Wars: World War II

Specifications
- Height: 6.125 inches (15.56 cm)
- Diameter: 2.5 inches (6.4 cm)
- Filling: TNT
- Filling weight: 3.5 ounces (99 g)

The A.P. Mine No. 3 was a British anti-personnel mine of World War II. The mine was developed and produced by the Royal Engineers in India due to a shortage of mines for the Burma campaign. The mine was simpler to lay than previous devices and could be placed by infantrymen, rather than sappers. The A.P. Mine No. 3 was a bounding shrapnel mine that was lethal at ranges of up to 30 yards (27 m).

== History ==
The mine was developed during the Second World War. Anti-personnel mines proved valuable in jungle warfare against the Japanese in the Burma campaign but the British troops, with supply lines in India, had only small numbers of Hong Kong Pineapple Mines. These were complicated weapons that had to be set by trained sappers (Royal Engineers) and not by the infantry. To solve this issue the A.P. Mine No. 3 was developed and produced by the Royal Engineers in India. Initially each battalion was issued 72 of the mines, but this was later doubled to 144. The A.P. Mine No. 3 was described as obsolescent by a 1946 United States Navy publication.

== Action ==
The A.P. Mine No. 3 was a shrapnel-based bounding mine. A pressure-actuated mine, it had a 1–2 second fuse that was intended to allow the enemy soldier to remove his foot from the pressure plate and advance. The mine would then be propelled into the air and explode at a height of 2–4 feet (60–120 cm), where the shrapnel could be lethal to personnel within a 30 yards (30 m) radius. The mine was set by being buried underground on top of a block of wood, to support its base. The mine was detonated when an operating sleeve was pressed down by the pressure plate. In the disarmed state the operating sleeve was held in place by a "safety spider" that fitted around a threaded bar in the centre of the mine and had four prongs that protruded into the body and bore on the main case. The spider was held in place by a wing nut on the threaded bar. The nut and spider were removed to arm the mine. It could be neutralised by replacing the nut and spider.

== Physical description ==
The A.P. Mine No. 3 was housed in a cylindrical steel case that was segmented, and seemingly derived from that of the No. 36 Mills bomb. The case measured 2.5 inches (6.4 cm) in diameter and was 6.125 inches (15.56 cm) high. The case was black with a 0.5-inch (1.3 cm) high ring of red crosses near to the top and a green band of the same height near the base. The pressure plate was circular and sat at the top of the cylinder. It required 38 pounds (17 kg) of pressure to detonate if the weight was applied at the centre of the plate and 7 pounds (3.2 kg) at the edge. The fuse was different than that employed in earlier British anti-personnel mines and relied on a "retaining ball" being displaced.

The mine was propelled into the air by a 100-grain (6.5 g) charge of G-20 gunpowder. The mine contained 3.5 ounces (99 g) of TNT explosive The entire mine weighed around 2 pounds 4 ounces (1.0 kg).
