= VS-JAP mine =

Italian anti-personnel mine

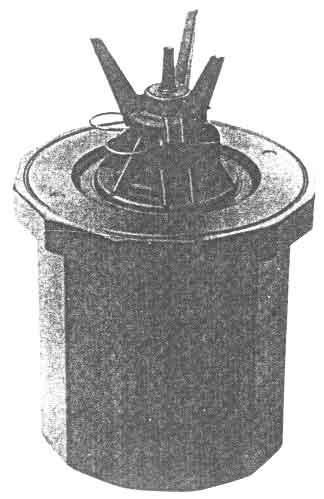
A VS-JAP mine.

The VS-JAP (Valsella Jumping Anti-Personnel) is an Italian bounding anti-personnel mine. It is the latest of the Valmara family of bounding mines that includes the Valmara 59 and Valmara 69. The mine has a waterproof plastic faceted cylindrical body with a three-pronged cap, with a central fixing point for a tripwire. The fuze is triggered via downward (someone treading on the mine) or sideways (pulling a tripwire) pressure.

When the mine is triggered a small propellant charge in the base launches the inner body of the mine into the air. When it reaches a height of approximately 50 cm, a steel wire is pulled taut, jerking a striker into the detonator of the mine, firing it. The mine's main explosive charge is surrounded by 1,200 steel cubes, which are reportedly lethal within 25 meters of the point of detonation.

== Specification ==
- Diameter: 130 mm
- Height: 190 mm
- Weight: 2.8 kg
- Explosive content: 0.5 kg of Composition B with a 9 g booster charge of RDX
- Operating pressure: 10.8 kg pressure, 4 to 6 kg pull
