= A.P. Mine E.P. No. 4 =

The A.P. Mine E.P. No. 4 was a landmine used by the United Kingdom and other Commonwealth countries during World War II.

== Parts ==
The mine has a cylindrical container of sheet metal, and a circular lid that is used to store a bounding mine. The bounding mine's sides and bottom are made of concrete and shrapnel. In the center of the bounding mine, three sticks of Gelignite act as the mine's explosive element. The mine's trigger is a pressure switch that activates the mine when it is stepped on. (The mine can use any British pressure switch beside the pressure switch E.P. No. 1, which was made specifically for it.) The pressure switch trigger and the mine are connected through a length of fuse buried beneath the ground, making the fuse invisible. The switch is buried under just enough loose soil to enable a human foot to step straight through the soil, and contact the pressure switch, triggering the mine. The mine's container is buried in a hole with a small amount of loose soil on top making it appear invisible. The pressure switch is also placed under enough dirt to make it invisible to enemy soldiers, but not so much soil that the bounding mine cannot breach the soil when exploding.

== Detonation process ==
The mine is triggered when a separate pressure switch close to the mine is stepped on.

Detonating the mine begins with a compression of the pressure switch, collapsing an igniter ampule in the tube. This lights a connected fuse that burns to the middle, triggering a black powder charge out just under the bounding mine in its container. This sends the bounding mine out of its container into the air. The fuse continues to burn as the mine rises and hits the ground, at which point the fuse burns to its end at the No. 27 detonators, triggering detonation of the mine's three Gelignite sticks. These explode the concrete mine and its impregnated shrapnel, greatly increasing the mine's lethality.

== Arming and disarming ==
The mine is armed by removing the bounding mine and fuse from the mine container and then inserting the part of the fuse, not meant for the ampule tube, into the pressure switch in the bounding mine's opening. The opposite end of the fuse is then inserted through the mine container opening and the bounding mine is put in its container. The remaining end of the fuse is attached to the pressure switch. Finally, three sticks of Gelignite are put into the bounding mine and the mine trigger device is attached to the bounding mine end of the fuse.

To disarm the mine, the fuse is cut at its connection with the bounding mine and then is disconnected from the pressure switch by its removal from the ampule tube. The fuse is then taken out of the bounding mine. The mine is now disarmed as the fuse that triggers the mine is disconnected from both the mine itself and the pressure switch trigger.
