= OZM =

Soviet bounding anti-personnel mines

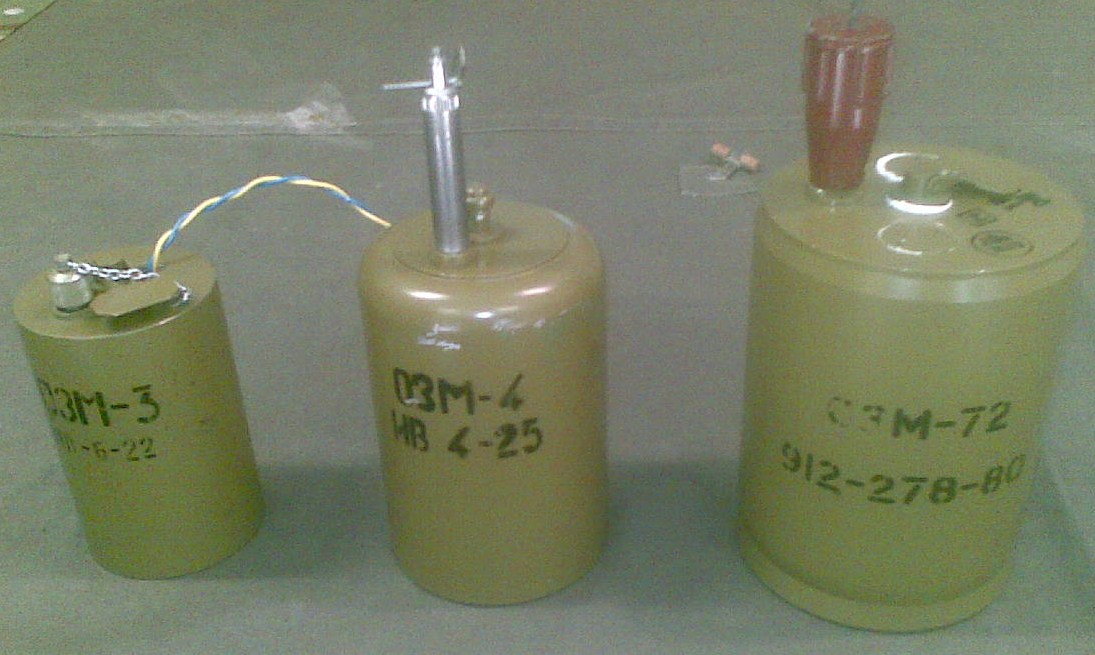
Armed OZM 3,4,72 anti-personnel mines

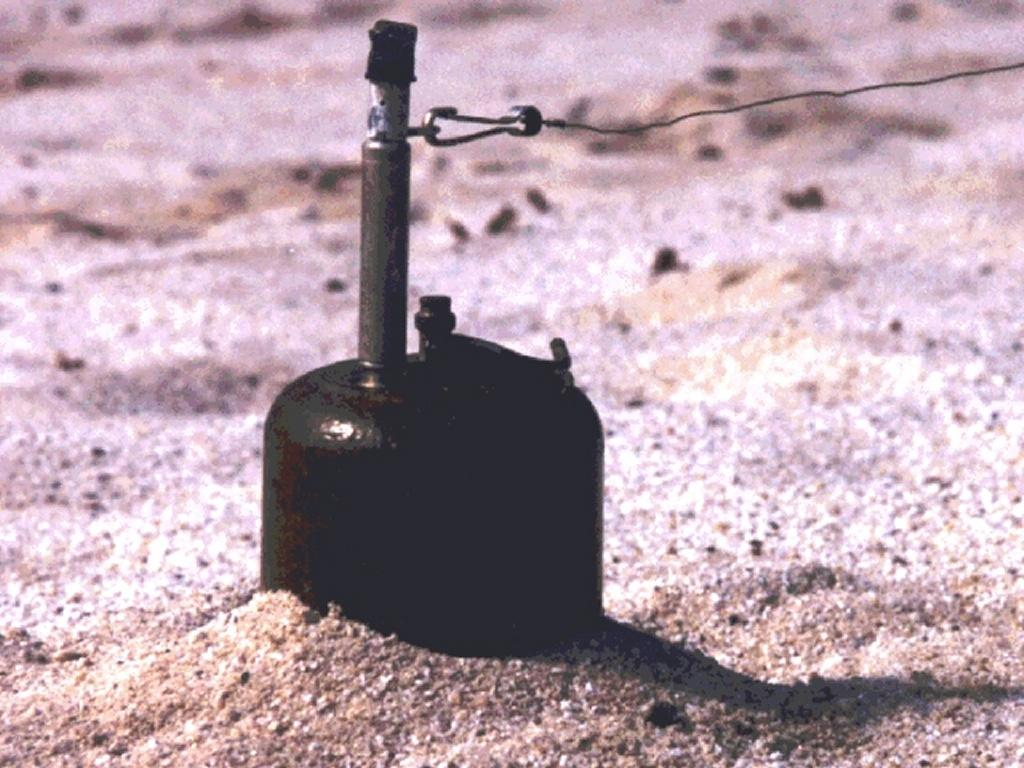
Armed OZM 4 anti-personnel mine in a minefield

The OZM-3, OZM-4 and OZM-72 are Soviet manufactured bounding type anti-personnel mines. They are fragmentation-barrier mines, which in the Russian and other post-Soviet armies as informally called "frog mine" or "witch".

They are normally painted olive green, and issued with a spool of tripwires and two green painted wooden or metal stakes for affixing the tripwires. Both OZM-3 and OZM-4 have cast iron fragmenting bodies while the OZM-72 also contains preformed steel fragments, and all three are issued with empty fuze wells, so a variety of fuzing options are possible.

== Operation ==
The mines can be activated by a variety of fuzes, including electronic fuzes or command initiation, although they are most commonly fitted with an MUV booby trap switch which is activated by a tripwire.

On firing, a metal base plate remains in the ground, while the mine body is thrown up by a small lifting charge, but remains attached to a strong wire tether. When the end of the tether is reached at a height of approximately 0.5 m, the main charge explodes and scatters fragments of the casing across a wide area.

OZM mine may sometimes be laid directly on top of an MS-3 mine. The MS-3 is an anti-handling device which closely resembles a PMN mine, except that it has a "blister" on top and operates purely as a pressure-release boobytrap. Lifting an OZM mine (without rendering safe the MS-3 placed underneath) will trigger detonation.

== Variants ==
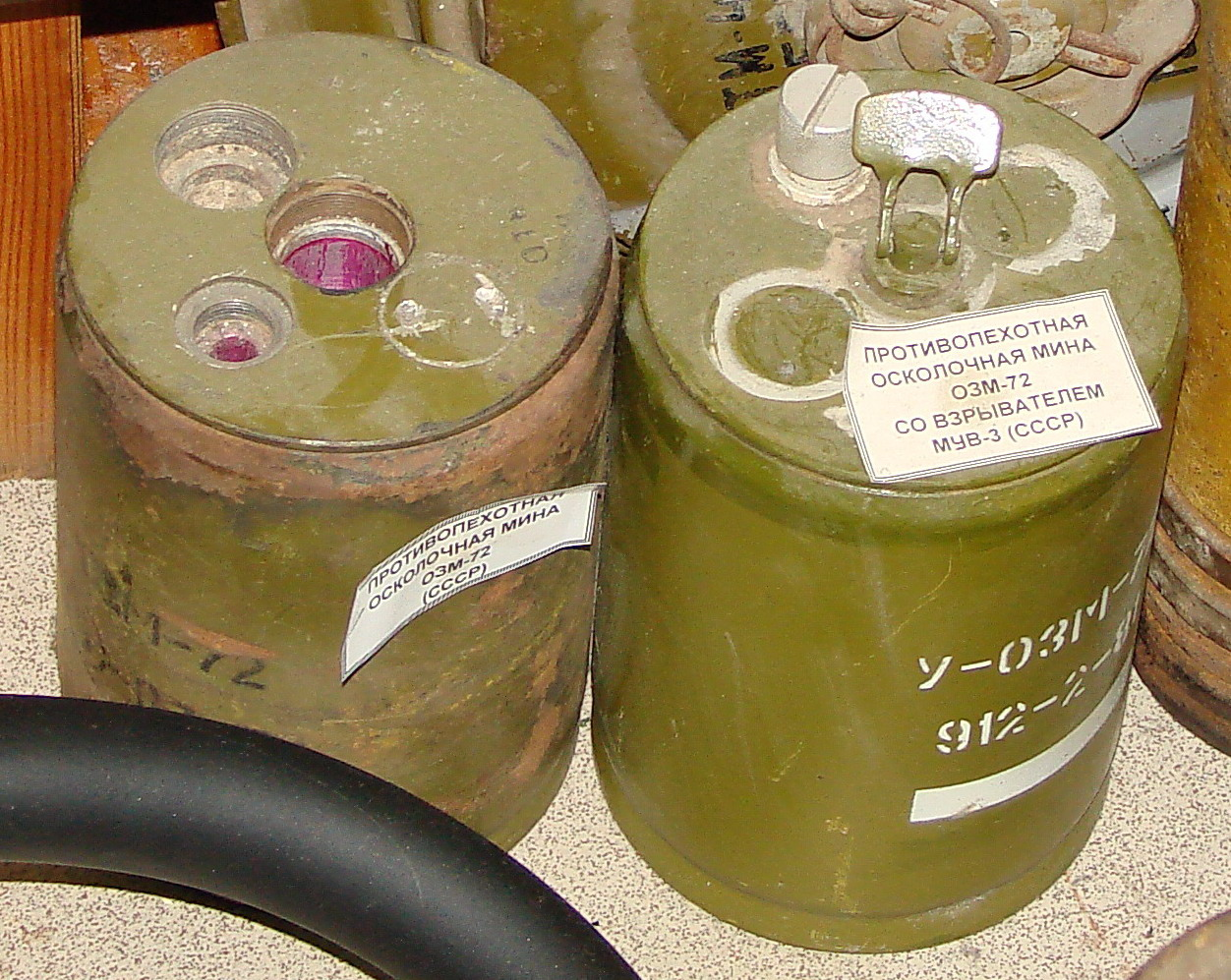
Soviet Anti-personnel landmines OZM-72, without and with fuse

=== OZM-3 ===
Casing material	cast iron
Weight	3.2 kg (7 lbs)
Fragmentation charge (TNT)	0.75 kg
Casing diameter	75 mm
Casing height	130 mm (5.1 inches)
Length of the sensor target (one-way)	5 or 10 m
Sensor sensitivity	0.5–1 kg (MUV, MUV-2); 1.5–6 kg (MUV-3, MUV-4)
Radius of guaranteed lethal destruction	9 meters (29.5 ft)
Temperature usage range	-40 to +50*C (-40 to +138*F)
Mine burst height	0.4–1.4 m
Sources	

=== OZM-4 ===
Casing material	cast iron
Weight	5.4 kg (12 lb)
Fragmentation charge (TNT)	0.75 kg
Casing diameter	90 mm (3.5 inches)
Casing height	170 mm (6.7 inches)
Length of the sensor target (one-way)	10 or 20 m
Sensor sensitivity	0.5–1 kg (MUV, MUV-2); 1.5–6 kg (MUV-3, MUV-4)
Radius of guaranteed lethal destruction	13 meters (42 ft)
Temperature usage range	-40 to +50*C (-40 to +138*F)
Mine burst height	0.6–0.8 m
Sources	

=== OZM-72 ===
Casing material	steel
Weight	5 kg (11 lbs)
Fragmentation charge (TNT)	660 gr (1.49 lb)
Casing diameter	108 mm (4.1 inches)
Casing height	172 mm (6.7 inches)
Sensor sensitivity	0.5–1 kg (MUV, MUV-2); 1.5–6 kg (MUV-3, MUV-4)
Radius of guaranteed lethal destruction	25–30 m
Radius of fragments	50 meters (164 ft)
Temperature usage range	-40 to +50*C (-40 to +138*F)
Number of preformed steel fragments	2400 pcs.
Mine burst height	0.6–0.9 m
Area of effects	2124 m²
Sources	

== Ottawa Treaty ==
Since the Ottawa Treaty, a number of countries have decided to retain their OZM mines, but convert them to command detonation only by destroying all fuzes which can be indiscriminately activated – potentially by non-combatants or animals. Belarus in particular has decided to keep 200,000 OZM-72.

== See also ==
- Valmara 59 – (Italy)
- Valmara 69 – (Italy)
- PROM-1 – (Yugoslavia)
- M16 mine – (United States)
- Land mine
