= M16 mine =

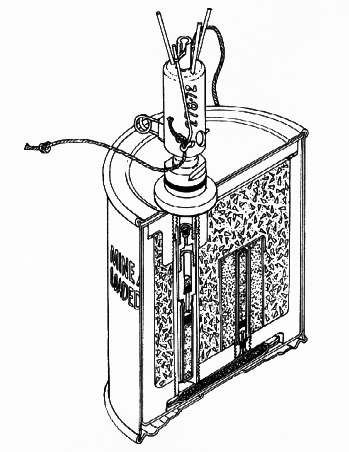
- A cutaway of an M16A2 mine
- Type: Bounding anti-personnel mine
- Place of origin: United States

Service history
- In service: 1957–present
- Used by: See description
- Wars: Vietnam War, other

Production history
- Produced: 1950s-1974
- No. built: Millions
- Variants: M16A1: M16A2; KM16A2

Specifications
- Mass: 4.1 kg
- Height: 127 mm
- Diameter: 102 mm
- Filling: TNT
- Filling weight: 1 LB
- Detonation mechanism: Various, including: S.Mi.Z 35 (pressure), Z.Z.35 (pull), Z.U.Z.Z. (tension release), E.S.Mi.Z (pressure and electric)

The M16 mine is a United States-made bounding anti-personnel mine. It was based on captured plans of the World War II era German S-mine and has similar performance.

== Description ==
The mine consists of a cast iron body in a thin steel sleeve. A central fuze well on the top of the mine is normally fitted with a pronged M605 pressure/tension (tripwire) fuze. Sufficient pressure on the prongs or tension on an attached tripwire causes the release of a striker. The freed striker is forced into a percussion cap which ignites a short pyrotechnic delay. The purpose of this delay is to allow the victim to move off the top of the mine, to prevent its upward movement from being blocked. Once the delay has burned through, a 4.5-gram black powder charge is ignited, which launches the inner iron body of the mine up into the air (leaving behind the steel outer sleeve). The charge also ignites a second pair of pyrotechnic delays.

The mine rises to a height of 0.3 to 1.7 meters before one or both of the pyrotechnic delays detonates the main charge of the mine, which sprays high-speed metal fragments 360° around the point of detonation. These metal fragments have an expected casualty radius of 27 meters for the M16 and M16A1 mines, and out to 30 meters for the M16A2 mine.

The M16 and M16A1 mines are similar; the M16A1 has redesigned detonators and boosters but remains largely the same. The M16A2 is considerably different, having an offset fuse well and only a single pyrotechnic delay element. This change reduces the weight of the mine considerably (2.83 kilograms) while allowing it to carry a slightly larger main charge (601 grams)

== Use ==
According to the United States Army, one platoon of combat engineers assisted by a hauling vehicle was expected to be able to emplace 300 M-16 mines in 120 minutes, creating a minefield 300 meters long and 50 meters wide with a linear density of one mine per meter of front.

The mines were sold widely and copies were produced in several countries including Greece, India, Myanmar, South Korea and Turkey. They can be found in the 'wild' in Angola, Burma, Cambodia, Chile, Cyprus, Eritrea, Ethiopia, Iran, Iraq, Korea, Lebanon, Laos, Malawi, Mozambique, Myanmar, Oman, Rwanda, Somalia, Thailand, Vietnam, the Western Sahara, and Zambia. The United States retains stocks of M16A2 mines for use in any resumption of war in Korea.

== Variants ==
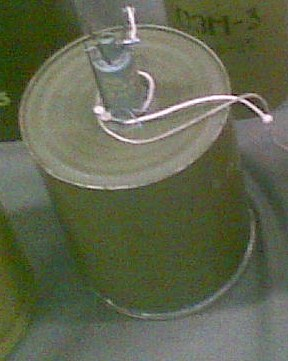
Photo of M16 mine

- M16
- M16A1 – Redesigned detonator and delay elements
- M16A2 – Single bounding delay element, reducing the weight
- KM16A2 – South Korean produced version of the M16A2

== Demining ==
When emplaced, most of an M16 mine is buried underground so it can be extremely difficult to spot them visually, particularly in areas of long grass, heavy undergrowth or other debris. The M16 contains large amounts of metal, so is very easy to detect using a mine detector, but the act of moving the detection head over the ground may strike the prongs and trigger the mine. In any case, other minimum metal mines may have been planted near to an M16 in order to protect it from mine clearance personnel. If long tripwires are fitted, the M16 may "see" the deminers before they find it. When tracking the path of tripwires fitted to any bounding mine, great care must be taken: it is possible that additional antipersonnel blast mines (e.g. the M14) may have been buried beneath its path. An extra complicating factor is that some M16 mines may have been fitted with an anti-handling device e.g. placing an M26 grenade underneath it with an M5 pressure-release boobytrap firing device screwed into it. Deliberately triggering the mines from cover, using some form of grappling hook attached to a long rope, may be useful in some situations and provide an initial way into the minefield before further clearance work begins.

== See also ==
- Valmara 59 – (Italy)
- Valmara 69 – (Italy)
- PROM-1 – (Yugoslavia)
- OZM – (Soviet Union)
- Ottawa Treaty
