= Valmara 59 =

Italian anti-personnel mine

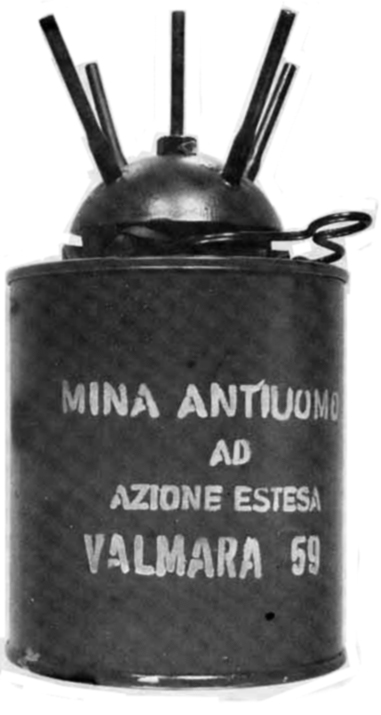
An image of a Valmara 59 mine from ORDATA

The Valmara 59 is a large cylindrical Italian bounding anti-personnel mine. It is the first in the "Valmara" family of mines produced by Valsella Meccanotecnica, and was followed by the Valmara 69 and VS-JAP. The mine's body is plastic with a distinctive five-pronged metal head. The central prong has a hole, to allow the threading a trip wire. The inner body of the mine has a main charge surrounded with approximately 1,000 steel cubes, below which is a steel wire connecting it to the base of the mine. When the mine is triggered a small charge launches the mine into the air approximately 45 cm before the steel wire is pulled taut, the jolt of which pulls a striker into the detonator. A secondary time fuse triggers the mine after three seconds if it has not detonated after being triggered.

The fragments produced by the mine are lethal to a range of 25 metres, and are capable of penetrating light armour.

== Specifications ==
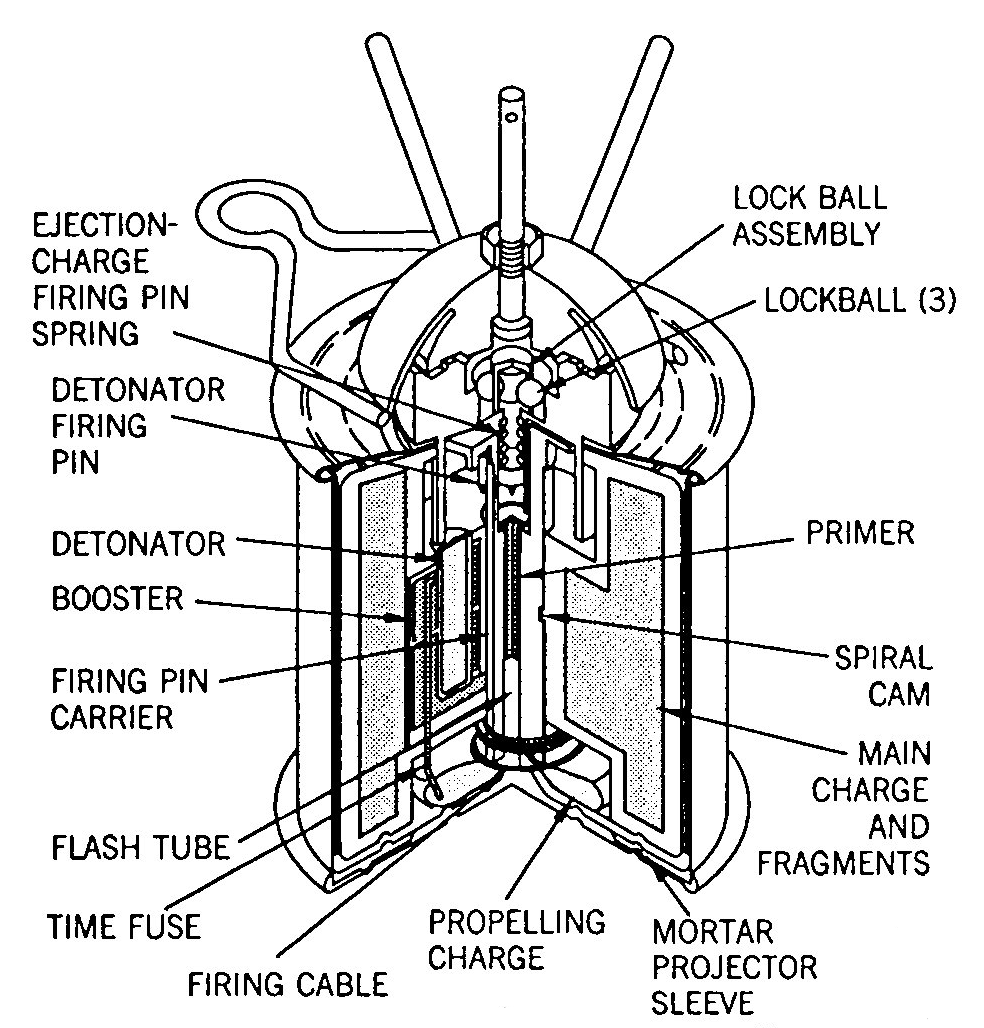
A cutaway of the mine showing the internal components

- Diameter: 102 mm
- Height: 196 mm
- Weight: 3.2 kg
- Explosive content: Reported between 0.42 kg and 0.56 kg of Composition B with a RDX booster charge.
- Operating pressure: 10.8 kg pressure, 6 kg pull.

== See also ==
- Valmara 69 – (Italy)
- PROM-1 – (Yugoslavia)
- OZM – (Soviet Union)
- M16 mine – (United States)
