= Bounding mine =

Explosive anti-personnel mine

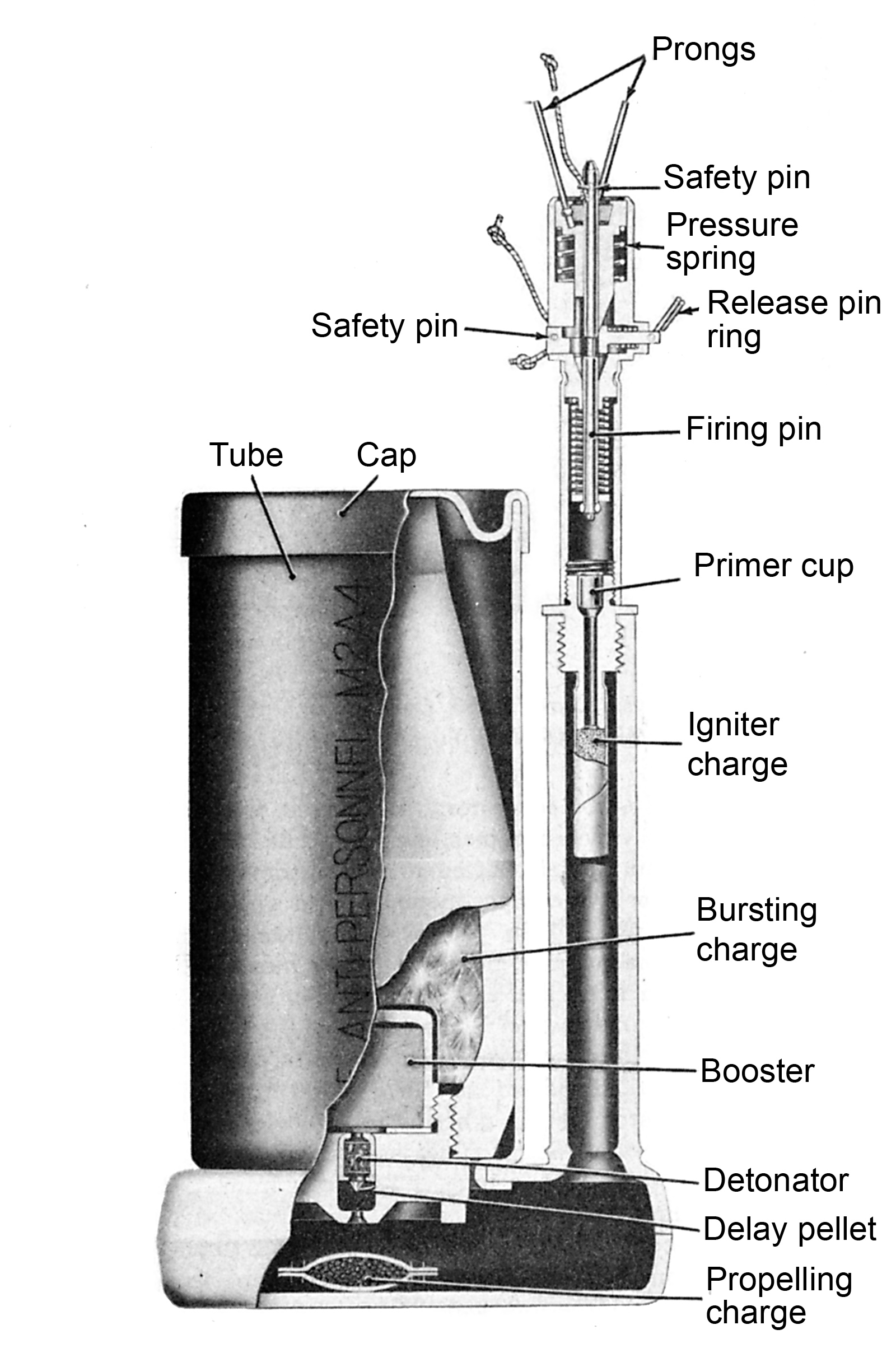
Cross-sectional view of a United States M2A4 bounding mine showing the fuze mechanism

A bounding mine is an anti-personnel mine designed to be used in open areas. When it is tripped, a small propelling charge launches the body of the mine 3 to 4 feet (91 to 122 centimetres) into the air, where the main charge detonates and sprays fragmentation at roughly waist height.

The original World War II German S-mine has been widely influential. Other countries that have employed bounding mines in war include the United States, United Kingdom, the Soviet Union, Vietnam and countries of former Yugoslavia. China and Italy have also produced them. Some American mines designed for this purpose used a standard 60 mm HE mortar round with an improvised time delay fuse which is activated by the propelling charge.

Bounding mines are more expensive than typical anti-personnel blast mines, and they do not lend themselves to scatterable designs. Because they are designed to be buried, they are appropriate for command-detonated ambushes, but tripwire operation is common as well. By design, bounding mines contain a large amount of steel, which makes them comparatively easy to detect with metal detectors. However, it is often the case that minimum metal mines are also planted in the same minefield, which complicates the demining process.

== Examples ==
- S-mine, Germany, nicknamed the Bouncing Betty by most Allied troops, “Frog” by Soviet troops and nicknamed the "Jumping Jack" by Australian and New Zealand soldiers.
- M16 APM, United States, based on captured S-mine plans. It launches 4 feet (1.2 meters) into the air and detonates, spraying high-speed metal fragments in all directions.
- A.P. Mine E.P. No. 4, UK and Commonwealth
- OZM, Russian family of mines (OZM-3, OZM-4 and OZM-72).
- PROM-1, Yugoslavia.
- Valmara 59, Italy.

== See also ==
- Land mine
