= Tripwire =

Passive triggering mechanism

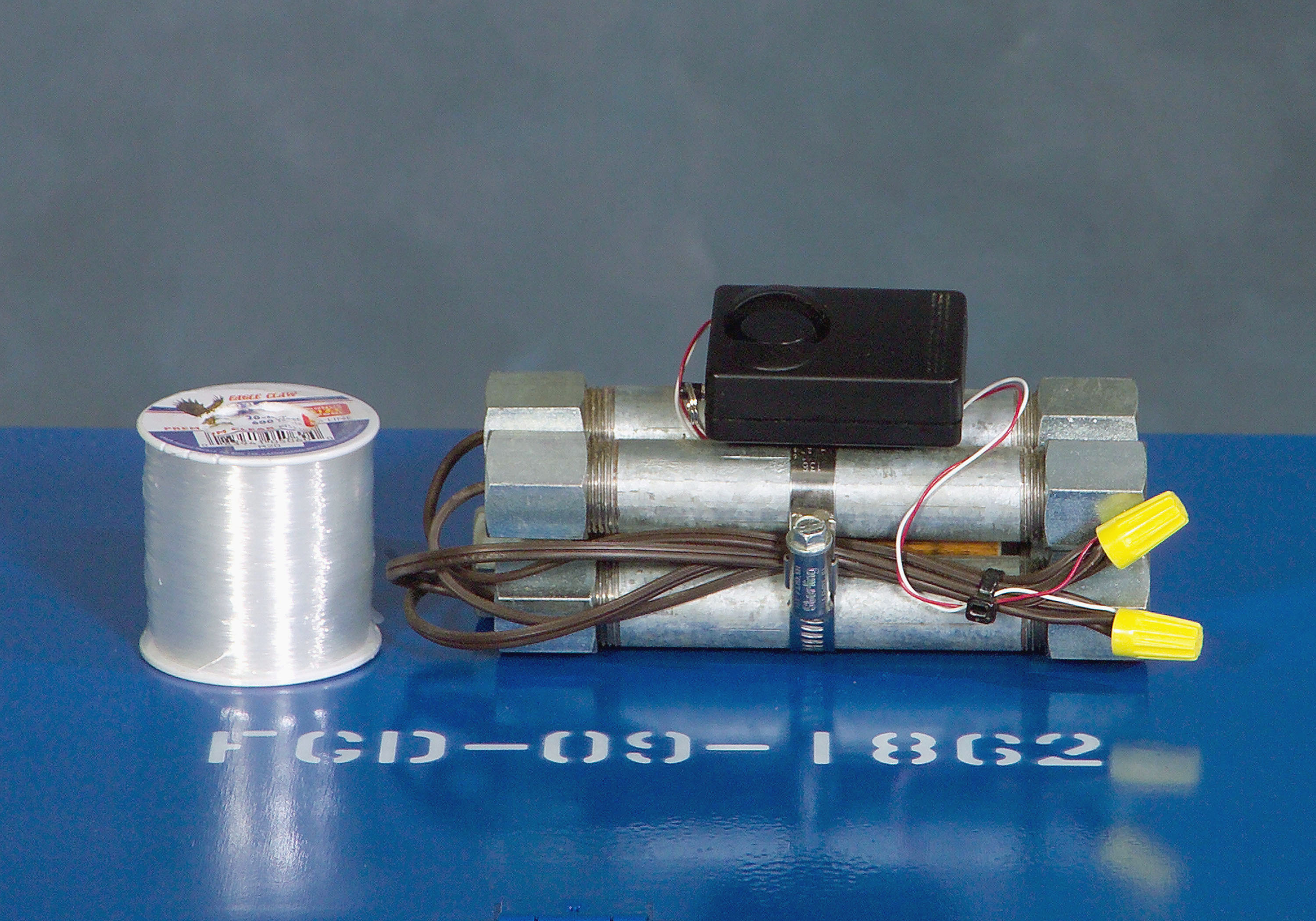
Simulated tripwire pipe bomb

A tripwire is a passive triggering mechanism. Typically, a wire or cord is attached to a device for detecting or reacting to physical movement.

== Military applications ==
Such tripwires may be attached to one or more mines — especially fragmentation or bounding mines — in order to increase the area where triggering may occur. Trip wires are frequently used in booby traps — where either a tug on the wire, or the release of tension on it, will trigger the explosives.

Soldiers sometimes detect the presence of tripwires by spraying the area with Silly String. It will settle to the ground in areas where there are no wires; where wires are present, the "strings" will rest on the taut wires without triggering the explosive, due to the product's light weight. Its use in detecting tripwires was first discovered in 1993 by Sergeant First Class David B. Chandler, Chief Instructor of the United States Army's Sapper Leader Course. That year it was introduced to students attending the course, and it was later used in combat for this purpose by U.S. troops in the Iraq War.

Another detection method is the use of green line lasers to illuminate and thus expose trip and command wires. The bright laser beam reflects off the tripwire and can be seen by the user.

== Industrial applications ==
A tripwire may be installed in the vicinity of industrial equipment, such as a conveyor belt to enable workers to stop the equipment quickly. These may also be called emergency stop pull-cords.
