= Landmines in Ukraine =

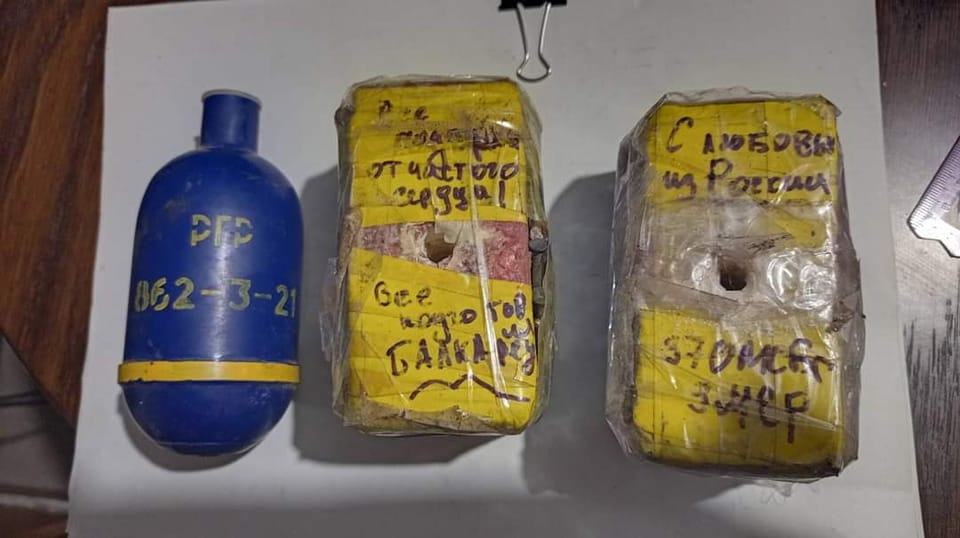
Russian landmines placed during Ukraine's advance in the 2022 Ukrainian southern counteroffensive reading "from a pure heart" and "with love from Russia".

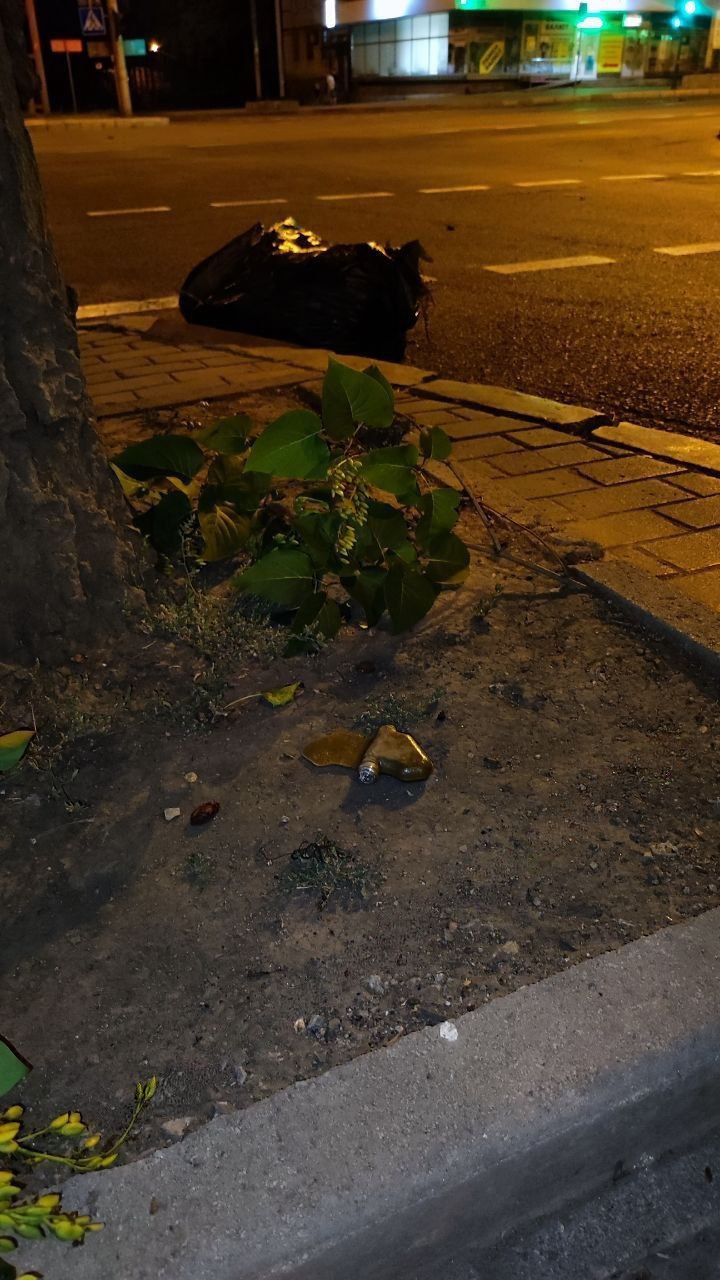
PFM-1 mine launched from air over Donetsk, 30 July 2022

Ukraine globally ranks as one of the states with the highest civilian casualties from landmines and unexploded ordnance, and the highest for anti-vehicle mine incidents. As of May 2026, it is estimated that approximately 132,000 square kilometers of Ukrainian territory are contaminated by landmines. Many types of landmines have been found in use in Ukraine, including novel variants. Though landmines have been in use since 2014 in Ukraine during the War in Donbas (2014–2022), their use was relatively sporadic until the Russian invasion of Ukraine. According to Human Rights Watch, both Russian and Ukrainian government forces have utilized anti-personnel and anti-vehicle mines.

== Background ==
On 24 February 1999, Ukraine became a signatory of the Ottawa Treaty, which prohibits the use of all types of victim-activated explosive devices. Conversely, Russia and the United States are not signatories of this agreement.

On 20 February 2014, Russia government forces invaded and annexed the Crimean peninsula, formally annexing the territory in March 2014. In April 2014, fighting broke out between Russian-backed separatist forces and Ukrainian government forces in eastern Ukraine.

On 24 February 2022, Russia initiated a currently-ongoing full-scale invasion of Ukraine, in which both anti-personnel and anti-vehicle landmines have been utilized, although the Russian Defense Ministry has not acknowledged the country's use of landmines.

On 19 November 2024, US President Joe Biden approved transfer of anti-personnel mines to Ukraine's military, despite the latter country still being a signatory to the Ottawa Treaty. Human rights groups criticized the decision.

On 29 June 2025, Ukrainian President Volodymyr Zelenskyy signed a decree enacting the decision of the National Security and Defence Council of Ukraine to withdraw the country from the treaty. The move led to further criticism from human rights groups and accusations that Ukraine was violating international law.

== Use of mines ==
As of January 2023, the State Emergency Service of Ukraine estimates that around 30% of Ukrainian territory may be contaminated by landmines. Other sources estimate this figure as high as 40%. In January 2025, the State Emergency Service of Ukraine reported that approximately 133,300 square kilometres, or about 20% of Ukraine’s territory, remained potentially contaminated by mines and explosive remnants of war, including temporarily occupied territories.

Russian forces have allegedly engaged in booby-trapping strategic positions from which they have retreated using landmines and other unexploded ordnance. There have been a significant amount of civilian casualties as a result. Ukrainian forces allegedly used a rocket-delivered anti-personnel mine in summer 2022, in violation of the Ottawa Treaty. Human Rights Watch traced back handwritten messages on unexploded ordnance to Ukrainian organizations which offered to inscribe "death wishes" on explosives to raise funds for the war effort.

Landmines reported in use in Ukraine since 2014
Category	Designation	Origin	Type	Initiation
Antipersonnel	MOB	Russia	Fragmentation	Multiple options
Antipersonnel	MON-50	Russia/USSR	Fragmentation	Tripwire/command
Antipersonnel	MON-90	Russia/USSR	Fragmentation	Tripwire/command
Antipersonnel	MON-100	Russia/USSR	Fragmentation	Tripwire/command
Antipersonnel	MON-200	Russia/USSR	Fragmentation	Tripwire/command
Antipersonnel	OZM-72	Russia/USSR	Fragmentation	Tripwire/command
Antipersonnel	PFM-1/PFM-1S	USSR	Blast	Pressure/self-destruct
Antipersonnel	PMN-2	Russia/USSR	Blast	Pressure
Antipersonnel	PMN-4	Russia	Blast	Pressure
Antipersonnel	POM-2/POM-2R	Russia/USSR	Fragmentation	Tripwire/self-destruct
Antipersonnel	POM-3	Russia	Fragmentation	Seismic
Anti-vehicle	TM-62M	Russia/USSR	Blast	Pressure
Anti-vehicle	PTM1-G	Russia/USSR	Blast	Tripwire/self-destruct
Anti-landing	PDM-1	Russia/USSR	Blast	Tilt-rod

== Casualties ==
From 2014 to 2020, there were 1,190 mine-related casualties in Ukraine.

According to the United Nations, from the start of the Russian invasion of Ukraine in February 2022 to July 2023, 298 civilians, 22 of them children, have been killed due to unexploded ordnance, and there have been 632 civilian injuries. HALO Trust estimates that civilian casualties are vastly underreported.

== Socioeconomic effects ==
Ukraine is one of the world's top agricultural producers. More than 55% of Ukraine's land is arable, and as of April 2022, provided employment for 14% of Ukraine's population. Due to the proliferation of mines and other unexploded ordnance in agricultural areas, Ukraine's agricultural sector has suffered more than $6.6 billion in damages. In some contaminated regions like Kherson, farmers have resorted to picking out unexploded shells by sight, and using armored and remote-operated tractors. Ukrainian officials estimate that as of March 2023, up to one-third of all arable land (approximately 10 million hectares) in areas of hostility are mined.

== Demining efforts ==
As of July 2023, the World Bank estimates that fully demining affected Ukrainian territory will cost upwards of $37 billion.

One of the key issues hindering demining efforts is the lack of qualified bomb disposal specialists and operators. Training generally lasts four months, and company certification three months. Additionally, there are only two certification bodies in Ukraine, the Ministry of Defence and the State Emergency Service of Ukraine. Additionally, the training of such specialists can be cost prohibitive, with the approximate cost of training a group of explosive specialists being approximately $100,000–$150,000 as of May 2023.
