= M68E1 =

M68E1 may refer to:

- the M60 Patton tanks 105 mm gun
- a practice version of the M18 Claymore mine
