= ML-7 mine =

Soviet booby trap mine

The ML-7 (From Russian: МЛ-7 – Мина Ловушка-7, Translation: Trap Mine-7) is a Soviet booby trap mine that serves the purpose of an anti-handling device for explosive charges or other anti-personnel mines. The ML-7 is generally used with PMN-1, PMN-2 and PMN-4 mines, but can also be used with any other item over 0.3 kg in weight.

== Description ==
The ML-7 presents itself as a plastic rectangular box, with two protruding sections containing the main charge on the side faces. For safer transportation, the mine has a safety pin fixed to the body of the mine with a split ring, as well as a rod holding the sensor lid, which can be removed by pulling on the red nylon ribbon. Time taken for the transfer of the mine from its transport mode to its combat mode is 45–1200 seconds, which allows for both safer installation & transportation. Further redundancies for prevention of accidental detonation include the safety-detonation device - SDD (responsible for the fuze-detonator-explosive chain, and to prevent accidental explosion during transportation) and the actuating mechanism, which is responsible for the activation of the SDD when the payload is displaced.

The mine is generally only used with the PMN series mines, as it does not have enough explosive power to set off other mines, specifically, the § OZM-72 mine. Usually, upon the installation of the ML-7 mine, it has an additional 0.4 kg of explosives next to it, to guarantee the explosion of the booby-trapped mine.

However, the mine can also be installed under other objects, such as flask of water. It is prohibited to mine any object that is under 0.3 kg in weight.

== Action ==
After the removal of the safety pin and expiration of the time required to arm the mine, the mine transfers into combat mode. Upon the removal of the object installed on top of the mine, a spring-loaded rod affects a lever, which moves up the frame of the mine, and lifts the lid. As soon as the lid is moved 6–8 mm up, another spring-loaded rod displaces the detonator. As the detonator is displaced, a striker filament heats up the casing of the detonator, which causes the detonator to blow up, along with the mine's charge. The detonation of the ML-7 causes the detonation of item on top of it, or maims the person that attempted the dislocation of the booby trapped item.

=== Destruction ===
Items that are booby trapped with the ML-7 cannot be removed or defused safely, and must be destroyed by large caliber fire.

== Specifications ==
- Weight
  - Mine: 0.1 kg
  - Charge: 0.04 kg
- Dimensions: 72x69x30 mm
- Body: plastic
- Target sensor diameter: 55 mm
- Sensitivity: load greater than 0.3 kg
- Arming time: 45 seconds at +50 °C to 20 minutes at −40 °C
- Detonator: integral
- Shelf life: 10 years
- Temperature range of use: -40 to +50 °С

== See also ==
- PFM-1 mine
- PMN mine
- Anti-tank mine
- PDM (series of amphibious mines)
- PTM-3 mine
