= Patron (dog) =

Ukrainian bomb-sniffing dog and mascot

Patron the Dog Пес Патрон
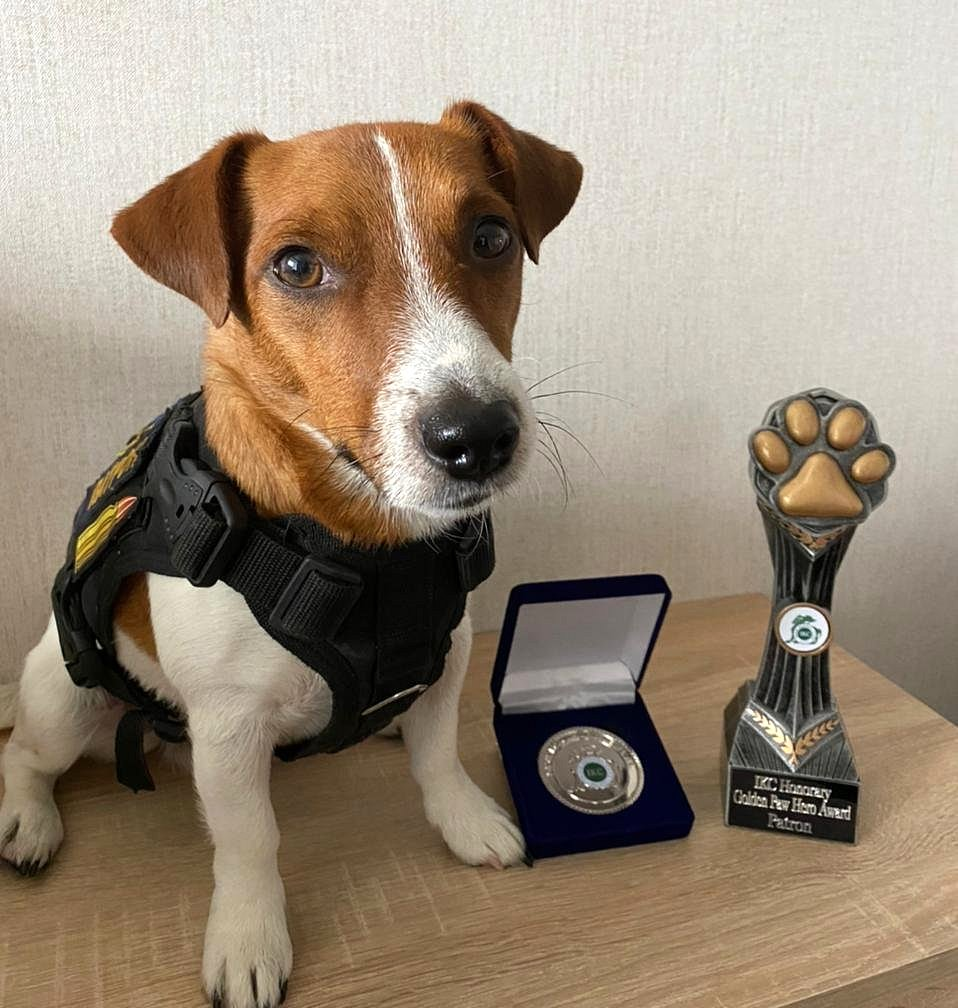
- Patron sitting next to his Golden Paw Award awarded by the Irish Kennel Club, June 2022.
- Breed: Jack Russell Terrier
- Born: 20 July 2019 (age 7); Chernihiv, Ukraine
- Nationality: Ukrainian
- Employer: State Emergency Service of Ukraine
- Owner: Mykhailo Iliev
- Named after: Ukrainian word for bullet cartridge
- Awards: Order for Courage, Third Class.

Patron (Ukrainian: Патрон, pronounced [pɐˈtrɔn], here meaning "cartridge"), mostly known as Patron the Dog (Ukrainian: Пес Патрон, born 20 July 2019), is a Jack Russell Terrier employed as a detection dog and mascot for the State Emergency Service of Ukraine.

Patron first came to prominence during the 2022 Russian invasion of Ukraine, during which Ukrainian president Volodymyr Zelenskyy awarded him the Order for Courage for his work in locating and defusing unexploded ordnance left behind by Russian troops. By 2023, Patron had helped locate hundreds of such devices.

== Life and fame ==
Patron was born on 20 July 2019. He was purchased as a puppy by Mykhailo "Misha" Iliev (born c. 1990), a bomb disposal technician from Chernihiv who has worked with the State Emergency Service of Ukraine since 2014. Iliev, who later became Patron's exclusive handler, originally intended to give the puppy to his son as a pet but soon began training Patron as a detection dog instead.

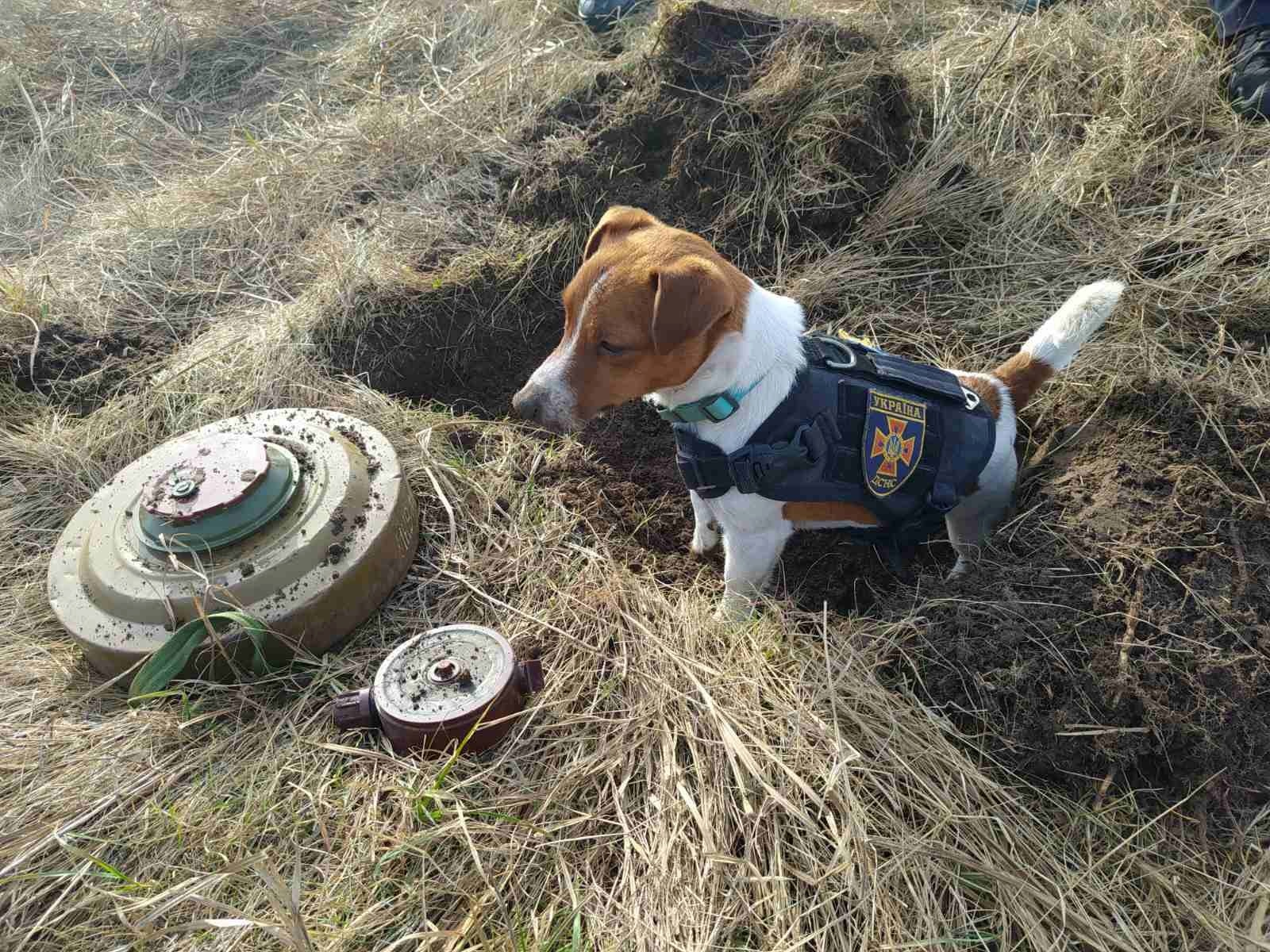
Patron standing next to two defused Russian land mines.

After Russia invaded Ukraine on 24 February 2022, Patron and Iliev began working to neutralize unexploded Russian bombs and land mines in and around Iliev's home city of Chernihiv. Patron became a celebrity after the State Emergency Service posted a video of him on Facebook on 19 March 2022. The video, in which Patron can be seen sniffing around debris and sitting in Iliev's lap while wearing a customized tactical harness personalized with his name in Cyrillic letters, went viral, garnering millions of views and reactions across social media platforms. In addition to his help in demining efforts, Patron has been actively involved in charity work, making visits to patients at the Okhmatdyt Children's Hospital in Kyiv.

On 15 May 2024, Patron was featured in the American documentary "Saving the Animals of Ukraine" that PBS aired during Season 42 of Nature, in which Misha describes his training and specialized vest, and others comment on Patron's growing fame and symbolism. Patron is seen at work finding ordnance, meeting with world leaders and UNICEF officials, and inspiring children in the classroom.

Despite numerous online death hoaxes circulating during the war, including a widespread rumor that the State Emergency Service of Ukraine formally denied in a video on 1 January 2025, Patron remains alive and actively serving as of 2026.

In September 2026, Patron married Lana, another Jack Russell Terrier, although they continued to live separately. In November 2026, the couple had puppies.

== Reception ==
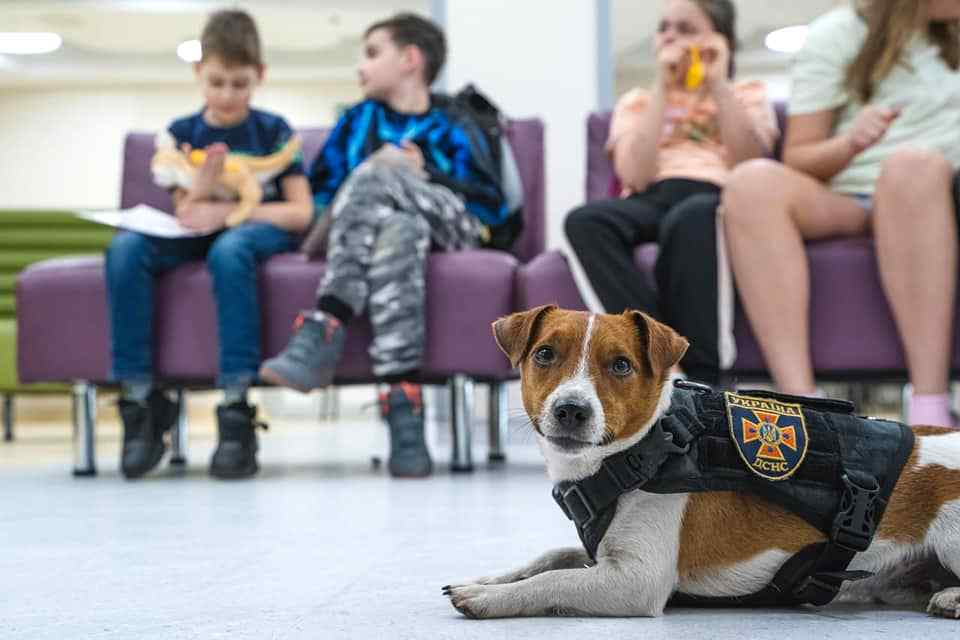
Patron in Okhmatdyt Children's Hospital, April 2022.

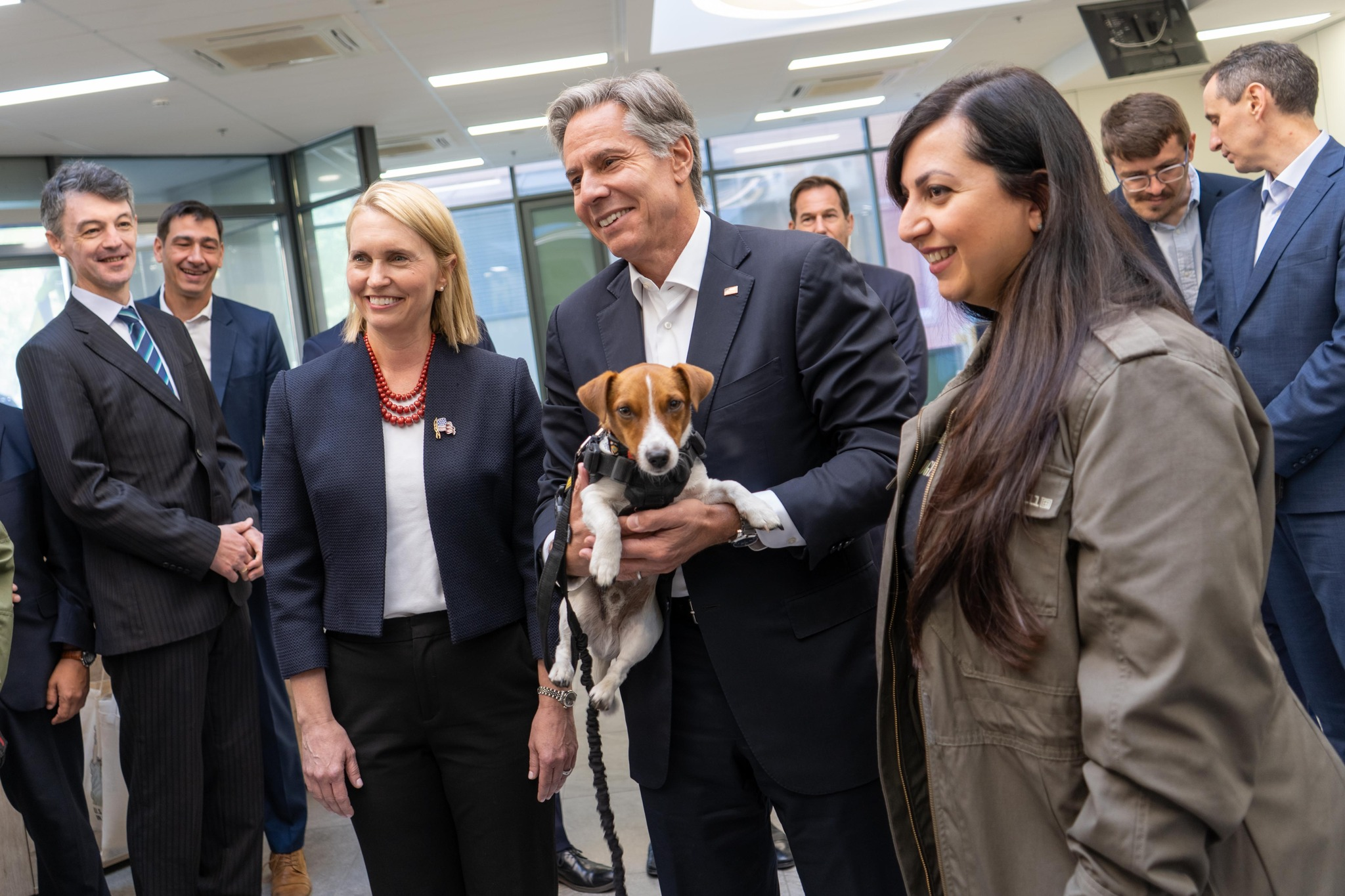
Patron with the United States Secretary of State Antony Blinken

Patron locating unexploded ordnance in Ukraine, 2022

Due to his viral fame, dangerous work, and charity appearances, Patron has been described as an "unexpected social media weapon" for Ukraine. The dog imagery was actively used for Ukrainian propaganda purposes, serving as a prime example of positive military propaganda to boost morale and highlight the crisis of landmines to an international audience.

His commercial and philanthropic brand has expanded significantly. In August 2022, Patron was humorously appointed as the director of the communications department for the animal rights organization UAnimals. Furthermore, his handlers launched the Charitable Foundation of Patron the Dog to raise funds for demining equipment and animal shelters. On 1 September 2022, Ukrposhta began selling charity stamps featuring Patron. By late December 2024 this stamp had fetched about $500,000; of which 80% was spent on mine-clearing equipment, and the rest on animal shelters.

Media analysts, including journalists from The New York Times and The Spectator, have noted that the growth of Patron's popularity is part of a broader Ukrainian information strategy during Russia's invasion. They observed that the use of viral videos with dramatic stories helps contribute to forming a desired narrative regarding the war. In Patron's case, it has the added benefit of raising awareness of the problem of mine-clearing in de-occupied territories of Ukraine.

== Recognition ==
On 5 May 2022, Minister of Internal Affairs Denys Monastyrsky announced the creation of the International Coordination Center for Humanitarian Demining, with Patron as its mascot. Four days later, Ukrainian president Volodymyr Zelenskyy, accompanied by Canadian prime minister Justin Trudeau, jointly honored Patron and Iliev with the Order for Courage, Third Class, thanking them for their service to Ukraine.

On 27 May 2022, Patron was awarded the Palm Dog Award for "DogManitarian Work" at the 2022 Cannes Film Festival.

To mark the celebration of World Children's Day, on 20 November 2022, UNICEF signed a memorandum of understanding with Patron's representatives to recognize Patron as the "Goodwill AmbassaDOG" in Ukraine.

In January 2023, a Patron YouTube channel was opened with an animated version of Patron starring. The cartoons, which taught children about mine safety, were produced with USAID support and in partnership with UNICEF. However, the series was abruptly suspended in September 2025 during its second season after the administration of US President Donald Trump broadly slashed USAID grant programs, stripping the project of its international funding.

In early February 2026, NATO Secretary General Mark Rutte met with Patron during a diplomatic trip to Chernihiv Oblast. Rutte later recounted the meeting at the 2026 Munich Security Conference, framing the dog as a powerful symbol of Ukrainian resilience by remarking, "I looked the dog in the eye, and he told me, 'we will never give in.'"

== See also ==
- Explosive ordnance disposal
- Landmines in Ukraine
- List of individual dogs
- Military animal
- Military mascot
