= MAPED F1 =

Anti-personnel mine

The MAPED F1 is a claymore-shaped plastic-bodied directional anti-personnel mine which is designed to wound or kill by fragmentation. It has been the standard directional anti-personnel mine of the French army since the late 1970s.

The MAPED F1 body is flat on the back and convex on the front, it has a small aiming sight on the top left corner and plastic lugs in the bottom corners for attaching a pair of "A" frame support legs. The mine contains a plastic explosive charge to propel 500 steel ball fragments to a range of 50 meters in a 60° arc. The MAPED F1 is battery powered and is normally actuated by breakwire, but tripwire and command actuation are also possible.

The MAPED F1 is surface mounted and it can be located visually or with metal detectors under most field conditions. The MAPED F1 can be defeated by blast overpressure from explosive breaching systems like the Giant Viper and MICLIC unless it is set up for command actuation.

== Mine operation ==
The MAPED F1 uses a very complex electric firing system. It is basically actuated by a contact wire. The battery pack and firing cable are attached to an electric detonator which is inserted in the mine and a spool of contact wire is rolled out. Any contact with the wire after the MAPED F1 is armed will break the fibre, which collapses an electrical circuit and triggers the mine.

== Hazards ==
The MAPED F1 is surface mounted. On detonation the mine will normally propel lethal fragmentation to a range between 40 and 60 meters. The actual hazard range for these types of mines can be as high as 300 metres based on US Army tests of the M18A1 "Claymore" (this is directly in front of the mine; fragmentation range and density drop off to 125 meters to the sides and rear of these mines).
