= MON-90 =

Soviet anti-personnel mine

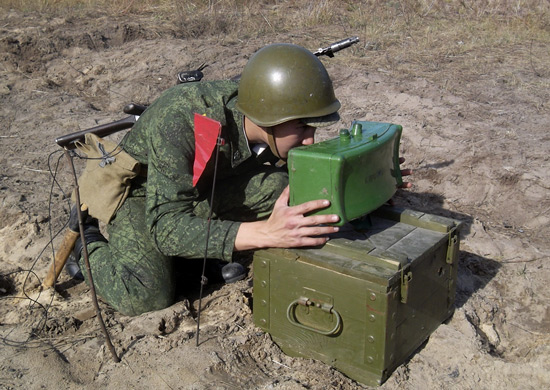
MON-90

The MON-90 (Russian: МОН-90) is a Claymore-shaped, plastic bodied, directional type of anti-personnel mine designed in the Soviet Union. It is designed to wound or kill by fragmentation. The mine is similar in appearance to the MON-50, but is approximately twice the size with a much greater depth.

== Design ==
The MON-90 has an attachment point on the bottom for connecting a special clamp which can be attached to wood, metal etc. but it has no scissor type legs. It has a sight centered on the top which is flanked by two detonator cavities. The mine contains 6.2 kg of RDX (PVV-5A) to propel approximately 2000 steel rod fragments to a lethal range of 90 meters in a 54° arc (60 m wide spread at 90 m range).

The MON-90 is usually command actuated using a PN manual inductor and an EDP-R electric detonator (ZT non-electric detonator also available). It can also be actuated by a variety of booby trap (BT) switches including:

- MUV series pull
- MVE-72 electric breakwire
- VP13 seismic controller.

The MON-90 is usually mounted above ground level on the surface or up in a tree to give the greatest dispersion of fragments. It is waterproof and will function effectively from temperatures of +50 to −50 °C. Due to its large size the MON-90 is effective against unarmored vehicles and it may have applications as an anti-helicopter mine.

It can be located visually or with metal detectors under most field conditions. Depending on its actuation method the MON 90 may be resistant to blast overpressure from explosive breaching systems like the Giant Viper and M58 MICLIC.

== Specifications ==
- Country of origin: Soviet Union
- Mine action:
- Material: Plastic casing
- Shape: Claymore
- Colour: Green, olive
- Total weight: 12.1 kg
- Explosive content: 6.2 kg PVV-5L
- Operating pressure (kg):
- Length: 345 mm
- Width: 153 mm
- Height: 202 mm
- Preformed fragments: 2000 balls or rollers, 7 mm each
- Radius of the continuous-effect area: 90 m (balls) / 99 m (rollers)
- Horizontal fragment spread: 54°
- Width of the continuous-effect area at 90 m: 60 m
- Operating temperature: −50 to +50 °C
- Fuze #1: Command detonated using PN manual inductor attached by demolition cable to an EDP-R electric detonator
- Fuze #2:
  - MUV Series Mechanical Pull
  - MVE-72 Electric Breakwire (battery powered)
  - VP13 Seismic Controller (battery powered)

== Disarming (demining) hazards ==
The MON-90 is known to be used with the VP13 seismic controller which prevents close approach for any clearance operations. If the mine is encountered with any type of electrical wires running from it, secure both ends of the wire before approaching the mine, because it could be linked to another mine or other booby trap device. Additionally, there may be other antipersonnel blast mines planted nearby, such as the PMN-2.

On detonation the mine will normally propel lethal fragmentation to a range of 90 meters. The actual hazard range for these types of mines can be as high as 300 metres based on US Army tests of the M18A1 Claymore (this is directly in front of the mine, fragmentation range and density drop off to 125 meters to the sides and rear of these mines).

== See also ==
- MON-50, similar but smaller claymore shaped AP mine.
- MON-100
- MON-200
- M18A1 Claymore Antipersonnel Mine
