= Claymore mine =

American directional anti-personnel mine

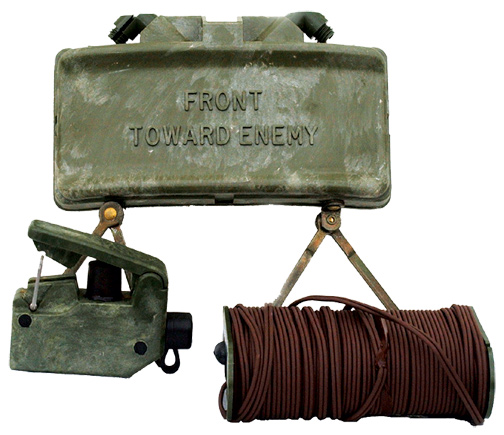
- The M18A1 Claymore mine with the M57 firing device and M4 electric blasting cap assembly.
- Type: Directional fragmentation anti-personnel mine
- Place of origin: United States

Service history
- In service: 1960–present
- Used by: United States, United Kingdom, Denmark
- Wars: Vietnam War; Korean conflict; Cambodian Civil War; Soviet–Afghan War; Iraq War; Gulf War; Operation Protective Edge; Bosnian War; Rhodesian Bush War; War in Afghanistan; Sri Lankan Civil War; Myanmar Civil War; Russian invasion of Ukraine

Production history
- Designer: Norman Macleod and others
- Designed: 1952–1956
- Manufacturer: Mohawk Electrical Systems
- Unit cost: $119 as of 1993

Specifications
- Mass: 3.5 lb (1.6 kg)
- Length: 8.5 in (216 mm)
- Width: 1.5 in (38 mm)
- Height: 4.9 in (124 mm)
- Caliber: .125, or 1/8-inch (3.2 mm) diameter steel balls, about 700 per unit
- Muzzle velocity: 3,995 ft/s (1,218 m/s)
- Effective firing range: 160 ft (50 m)
- Maximum firing range: 820 ft (250 m)
- Sights: Peep sight on early models, later a knife edge sight
- Filling: C-4
- Filling weight: 24 oz (680 g)
- Detonation mechanism: Blasting Cap Assembly M4

The Claymore mine is a directional anti-personnel mine developed for the United States Armed Forces, invented by Norman MacLeod. Unlike a conventional land mine, the Claymore may be command-detonated (fired by remote-control), and is directional, shooting a wide range of steel balls into a kill zone. The Claymore can also be activated by a booby-trap tripwire firing system for use in area denial operations.

The Claymore fires steel balls out to about 300 ft (100 m) within a 60° arc in front of the device. It is used primarily in ambushes and as an anti-infiltration device against enemy infantry. It is also used against unarmored vehicles.

Many countries have developed and used mines like the Claymore. Examples include models MON-50, MON-90, MON-100, and MON-200 introduced by the Soviet Union and used by its successor Russia, as well as MRUD (Serbia), MAPED F1 (France), and Mini MS-803 (South Africa).

== Description ==
The M18A1 Claymore mine has a horizontally convex gray-green plastic case (inert training versions are light blue or green with a light blue band). The shape was developed through experimentation to deliver the optimum distribution of fragments at 160 ft (50 m) range. The case has the words "FRONT TOWARD ENEMY" embossed on the front of the mine. A simple open sight on the top surface allows for aiming the mine. Two pairs of scissor legs attached to the bottom support the mine and allow it to be aimed vertically. On both sides of the sight are fuse wells set at 45°.

Internally the mine contains a layer of C-4 explosive behind a matrix of about seven hundred 1/8-inch-diameter (3 mm) steel balls set into an epoxy resin.

When the M18A1 is detonated, the explosion drives the matrix forward, out of the mine at a velocity of 3,900 ft/s (1,200 m/s), at the same time breaking it into individual fragments. The steel balls are projected in a 60° fan-shaped pattern 7 feet (2 m) high and 160 ft (50 m) wide at a range of 160 ft (50 m). The force of the explosion deforms the relatively soft steel balls into a shape similar to a .22 rimfire projectile. These fragments are moderately effective up to a range of 330 ft (100 m), with a hit probability of around 10% on a prone man-sized 1.3-square-foot (0.12 m^{2}) target. The fragments can travel up to 800 ft (250 m). The optimum effective range is 160 ft (50 m), at which the optimal balance is achieved between lethality and area coverage, with a hit probability of 30% on a man-sized target.

The weapon and all its accessories are carried in an M7 bandolier ("Claymore bag"). The mine is detonated as enemy personnel enter the killing zone. Controlled detonation may be accomplished by use of either an electrical or non-electrical firing system. When mines are employed in the controlled role, they are treated as individual weapons and are reported in the unit fire plan. They are not reported as mines; however, the emplacing unit must ensure that the mines are removed, detonated, or turned over to a relieving unit. The 100-foot (30 m) M4 electric firing wire on a green plastic spool is provided in each bandolier. The M57 firing device (colloquially referred to as the "clacker") is included with each mine. An M40 circuit test set is packed in each case of six mines. When the mines are daisy-chained together, one firing device can detonate several mines.

The mine can be detonated by any mechanism that activates the blasting cap. There are field-expedient methods of detonating the mine by tripwire, or by a timer, but these are rarely used.

== Development ==
The development of the M18A1 mine dates back to work done during World War II. The Misnay–Schardin effect was independently discovered during that war by József Misnay, a Hungarian, and Hubert Schardin, a German. When a sheet of explosive detonates in contact with a heavy backing surface (for example, a metal plate), the resulting blast is primarily directed away from the surface in a single direction. Schardin spent some time developing the discovery as a side-attack anti-tank weapon, but development was incomplete at the end of the war. Schardin also spent time researching a "trench mine" that used a directional fragmentation effect.

=== Norman MacLeod and Calord Corporation ===
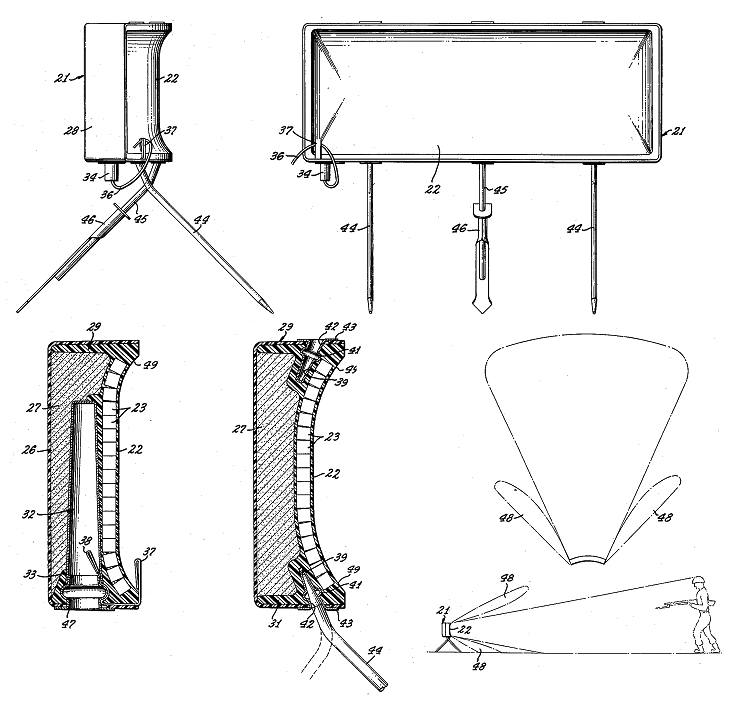
Images from the 1956 Macleod patent

Following the massed Chinese attacks during the Korean War, Canada and the United States began to develop projects to counter them. Canada fielded a weapon called the "Phoenix" landmine, which used the Misnay–Schardin effect to project a spray of 0.25-inch (6.4 mm) steel cubes towards the enemy. The cubes were embedded in 5 pounds (2.3 kg) of Composition B explosive. It was too large to be a practical infantry weapon and was relatively ineffective, with a maximum effective range of only 70 to 100 feet (20 to 30 m).

Around 1952 Norman MacLeod, at his company the Calord Corporation, began working on a small directional mine for use by infantry. It is not clear if the United States Picatinny Arsenal took the concept from the Canadian weapon and asked Norman MacLeod to develop it, or if he developed the design independently and presented it to them. MacLeod designed a weapon called the T-48; broadly similar to the final M18A1, it lacked a number of the design details that made the M18A1 effective.

Through Picatinny, the United States Army accepted the weapon into service as the M18 Claymore and approximately 10,000 were produced. It was used in small numbers in Vietnam from around 1961. It was not until the improved M18A1 was developed that the Claymore became a widely used weapon.

The mine was apparently named by its inventor, Norman MacLeod, after the claymore, a two-handed Scottish sword associated with his Scottish ancestry. The word “claymore” derives from the Scottish Gaelic claidheamh mòr, meaning “great sword”.

MacLeod applied for a patent for the mine on 18 January 1956, and was granted it in February 1961. The patent was later the subject of a civil court case between MacLeod, the Army, and Aerojet, which further developed the Claymore design. MacLeod's case collapsed when photographs of the German Trenchmine prototype were produced as evidence of prior art.

The original M18 was 9.25 inches (235 mm) long and 3.27 inches (83 mm) high, held in a plastic case with three folding spike legs on the bottom. An electrical blasting cap for triggering the mine was inserted through a small hole in the side. Internally the mine consisted of a layer of 12 ounces (340 g) of C-3 explosive (the forerunner of C-4 explosive) in front of which was laid an array of 0.25-inch (6.4 mm) steel cubes. In total the mine weighed about 2.43 pounds (1.10 kg), and could be fitted with an optional peep sight for aiming. It lacked the later version's iconic "FRONT TOWARD ENEMY" marking. The mine was planted in the ground, using its three sharp legs, and aimed in the direction of enemy approach; at that point, it was fitted with an electrical blasting cap. The mine was triggered from a safe position, preferably to the side and rear. The mine was barely more than a prototype and was not considered a "reliable casualty producer"; like the Phoenix it had an effective range of only 90 feet (30 m).

=== Throner, Kennedy, Bledsoe, and Kincheloe at Aerojet ===
The original M18 Claymore mine. The detonator is inserted into the side.

In 1954 Picatinny Arsenal issued a request for proposals (RFP) to improve the M18 as a more effective weapon. At Aerojet in the early 1950s, Guy C. Throner had independently come up with a design for a Claymore-like mine. He worked with Don Kennedy and the two men submitted a 30-page proposal in response to Picatinny's RFP. They were awarded a $375,000 development contract to improve the Claymore design. The Picatinny criteria for the weapon were as follows:

- It must weigh less than 3.5 pounds (1.6 kilograms)
- It must throw enough fragments so that at a range of 55 yards (50 m) it achieves a 100 percent strike rate on a 1.3-square-foot (0.12 m^{2}) target (man-sized)
- The fragment area must not be more than 8 feet (2.4 m) high and no more than 60° wide
- Fragments must have a velocity of 4,000 feet per second (1,200 m/s) providing 58 foot-pounds (79 joules) of kinetic energy delivered to the target.

The requirement for kinetic energy was based on the fact that 58-foot-pounds is required to deliver a potentially lethal injury. Given the requirements of weight and fragment density, approximately 700 fragments were needed, with the ability to aim the mine with an accuracy of around 2 feet (0.6 m) at the center of the target zone. The team at Aerojet were given access to all previous research into directional mines, including the M18 and the Phoenix, as well as German research. Dr. John Bledsoe led the initial project.

The original M18 mine fell far short of Picatinny's requirements. One of the first improvements was to replace the steel cubes with 7/32-inch (5.6 mm) hardened 52100 alloy ball bearings. These performed poorly for two reasons. Firstly, the hardened steel balls spalled into fragments when hit by the shock of the explosion; the fragments were neither aerodynamic enough nor large enough to perform effectively. Secondly, the blast "leaked" between the balls, reducing their velocity.

A second problem was the curvature of the mine. This was determined experimentally by Bledsoe, through a large number of test firings. After Bledsoe left the project to work at the Rheem corporation, William Kincheloe, another engineer, came onto the Claymore project.

Kincheloe immediately suggested using softer 1/8-inch (3.2 mm) steel "gingle" balls, which were used in the foundry process. They did not spall from the shock of the explosive, but deformed into a useful aerodynamic shape similar to a .22 rimfire projectile. Using a homemade chronograph, the engineers clocked the balls at 3,775 feet per second (1,151 m/s). The second change was to use a poured plastic matrix to briefly contain the blast from the explosive, so that more of the blast energy was converted into projectile velocity. After a number of experiments, the engineers settled on Devcon-S steel-filled epoxy to hold the balls in place. With this change, the velocity improved to 3,995 feet per second (1,218 m/s).

Technical challenges to overcome included developing a case to contain the corrosive C-3 explosive that would be durable enough to withstand months of field handling in wide temperature ranges. Using dyes to test various plastics for leaks, they found a suitable plastic called Durex 1661½, which could be easily molded into a case.

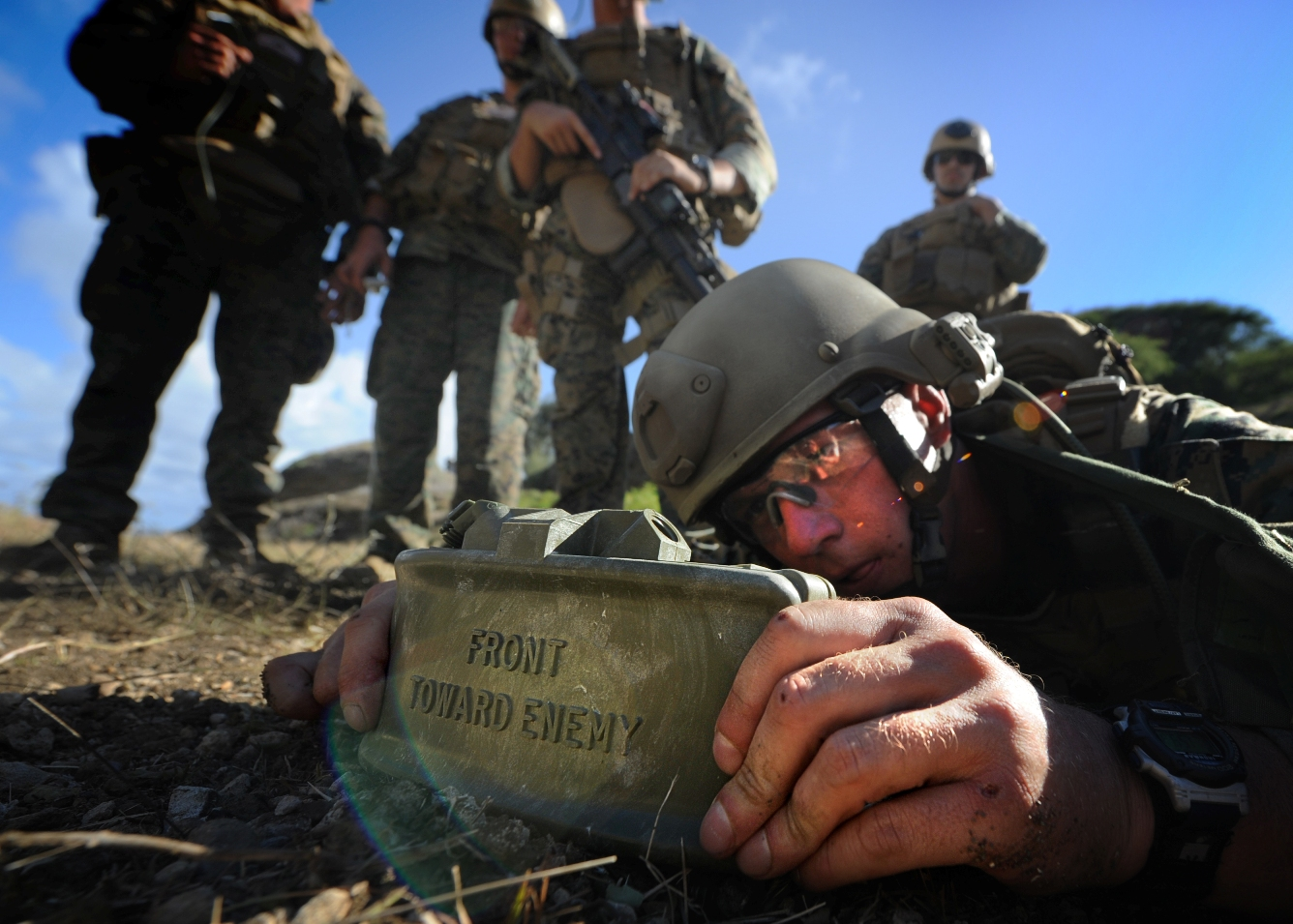
A US Marine places a Claymore mine.

By the spring of 1956, Aerojet had a near-final design. It was awarded a pre-production contract for 1,000 M18A1 Claymores, designated T-48E1 during testing. The initial versions of the mine used two pairs of wire legs produced from number 9 (3 mm) wire. Later when production was ramped up, the design was changed to flat steel scissor, folding-type legs.

Early pre-production mines were triggered using a battery pack, which had been used with the M18. This was found to be undesirable for a number of reasons. Bill Kincheloe came up with the idea of using a "Tiny Tim" toggle generator, of the type used with a number of Navy rockets. Originally an aluminum box was used to hold the generator. Later a Philadelphia company, Molded Plastic Insulation Company, took over the manufacture of the firing device for the first large-scale production run producing a plastic device.

The sighting for the device was originally intended to be a cheap pentaprism device, which would allow the user to look down from above and see the sight picture. After locating a suitably low-cost device, the engineers found that fumes from either the C-3 explosive or the cement used to glue the sight to the top of the mine corroded the plastic mirrors, rendering them unusable. They adopted simple peep sights, which were later replaced by a knife blade sight.

Testing concluded that the mine was effective out to approximately 110 yards (100 m), being capable of hitting 10% of the attacking force. At 55 yards (50 m), this increased to 30%. The development project completed, the Aerojet team sent the project back to Picatinny. The Arsenal bid it out to various component suppliers. In 1960 it was type standardized as the M18A1. It was first used in Vietnam in the spring or early summer 1966.

Minor modifications were made to the mine during its service. A layer of tinfoil was added between the fragmentation matrix and the explosive, protecting the steel fragments from corrosion and slightly improving fragment velocity. A ferrite choke was added to prevent RF signals and lightning from triggering the mine.

== Variants ==
=== M68 inert training kit ===
The M68 kit is designed to familiarize personnel with the placement and arming of a real M18 directional mine. It comes with all the components of a real Claymore kit packed in an M7 bandolier. The light blue or black plastic M33 inert anti-personnel mine is the training and practice version of the M18A1 Claymore. Some inert mines were green with a light blue band. It does not contain an explosive or pyrotechnic filler of any kind. It is packed in a Claymore bag with inert M10 simulated detonator cap wire, an M57 "clacker" firing control, and an M40 circuit test kit.

=== Mini-Multi-Purpose Infantry Munition ===
In early 2015, the U.S. Army began testing a smaller version of the Claymore called the Mini-Multi-Purpose Infantry Munition (M-MPIMS). It weighs 2 pounds (0.9 kg) and has a 160 ft (50 m) effective range, similar to the full-size Claymore. At its optimized range of 100 ft (30 m), the fragmentation zone is 75 ft (23 m) wide and 7 ft (2 m) high, with a minimum of five hits per square meter (0.5 per square foot). It has the surface space of an average smartphone and includes a Picatinny rail for camera, laser, or other attachments. The M-MPIMS is designed to be more controllable than the Claymore with less collateral damage, using an insensitive munitions explosive that is poured rather than packed for more uniform distribution results in more consistent blast pattern. Rear-safety distance has been decreased to 50 ft (15 m) and shelf life has been increased to 25 years.

== International directional fragmentation AP mines ==
PADMINE is an anti-personnel directional fragmentation mine produced by the United Kingdom, similar to the Claymore in cosmetic design with two swivelling legs, inserted into soft-ground. Its lethality out to 160 feet (50 m) arrives in the form of 650 steel balls and it is activated by remote control or trip wire.

The M18 directional fragmentation anti-personnel mine, developed by Cardoen of Chile, contains 626 grams of explosives, surrounded by 607 anti-personnel fragmentation units providing a 60° arc of fire, with a 160-to-820-foot (50 to 250 m) lethal range.

Italy produces the DAF M6 and DAF M7 directional fragmentation mines, weighing 40 and 22 pounds (18 and 10 kg) respectively, with trip wire or remote control detonation. Their appearance is similar to the Claymore mine.

== National copies ==
A number of licensed and unlicensed copies of the mine have been produced.

- Canada: C19 Defensive and Support Mine
- Chile: M18

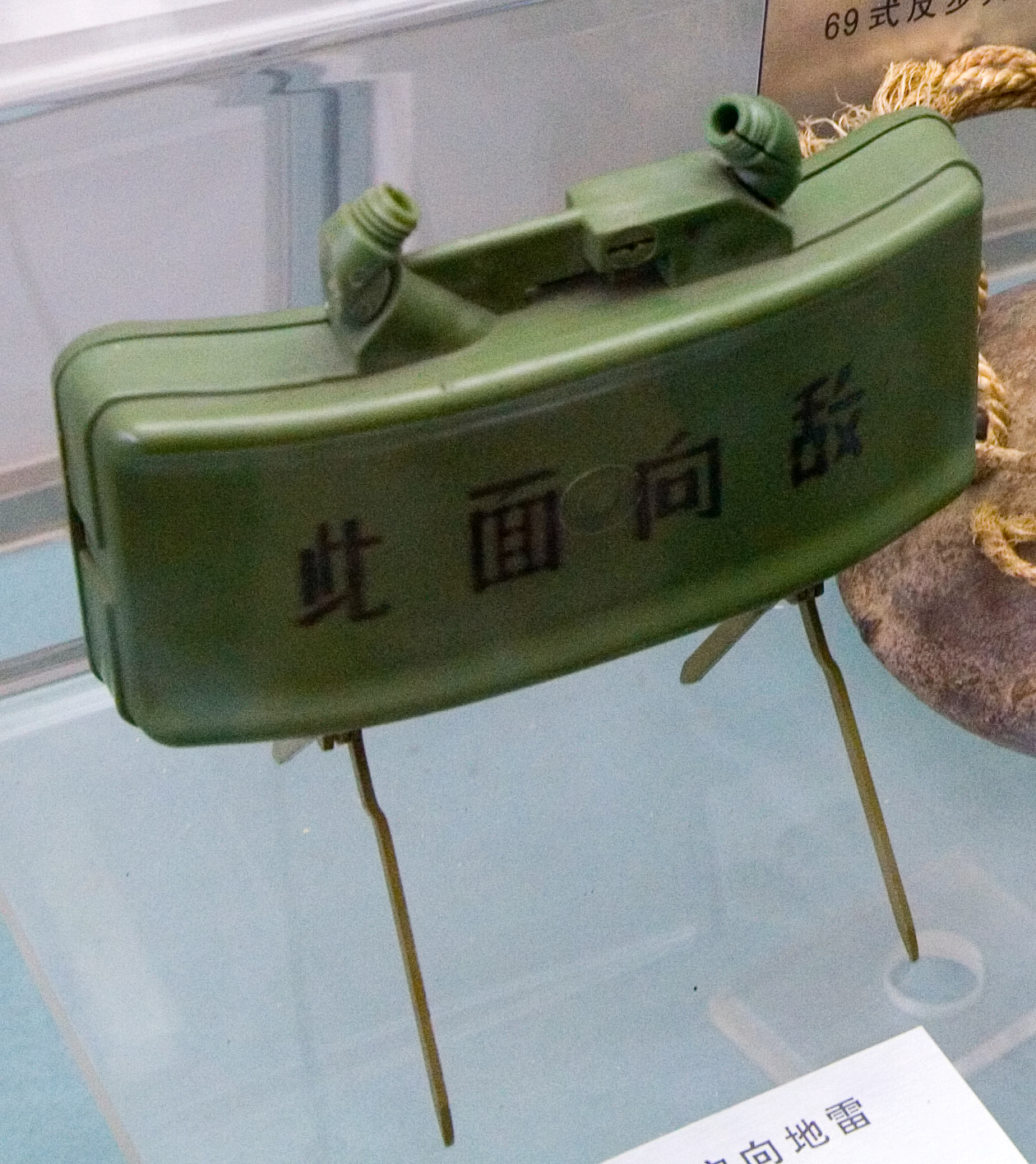
Chinese Type 66

- China: Type 66 mine. Chinese copy of the Claymore mine
- Finland: Viuhkapanos (Directional Charge) VP 88, "heavier" VP 84 and VP 2010
- Hungary: IHR-60
- Italy: VS-DAFM 7
- Pakistan: P5 Mk1
- Philippines: M18A2
- Poland: M18 Claymore
- Russia: MON-50
- Saudi Arabia: M18A/M18A1
- Serbia: MRUD (Mina Rasprskavajućeg Usmerenog Dejstva)
- South Africa:
  - Shrapnel mine No 2
  - Mini MS 803 mine
- South Korea:
  - K440, slightly smaller than the Claymore with 770 fragments.
  - KM18A1
- Sweden:
  - FFV-013
  - Försvarsladdning 21
  - LI-12/Truppmina 12
- Turkey: M18 AP Mine
- United States: Arms Tech MM-1 "Minimore", a smaller variant conceived for special forces use
- Vietnam: MDH-C40. North Vietnamese copy during Vietnam War

=== Non-state actors ===
- Viet Cong: Used homemade copies of Claymore mines.
- Provisional IRA: used home-made variants in the Troubles. Dissident Irish Republicans have continued to develop them.

== See also ==
- List of individual weapons of the U.S. Armed Forces
- Punt gun – similar killing effects at a wide area

== Bibliography ==
- Rottman, Gordon L. (2020). Vietnam War Booby Traps. Oxford: Osprey Publishing. ISBN 978-1472842459.
