= MRUD =

- Type: Directional fragmentation anti-personnel mine
- Place of origin: Yugoslavia

Service history
- Used by: Yugoslavia

Production history
- Manufacturer: Miloje Zakic Military Factory, now Trayal and

Specifications
- Mass: 1.5 kg (3.3 lb)
- Length: 230 mm (9.1 in)
- Width: 50 mm (2.0 in)
- Height: 89 mm (3.5 in)
- Caliber: .22, or 5.5 mm (0.22 in) steel balls, c. 650 per unit
- Effective firing range: 50 m
- Filling: TNT-based plastic explosive
- Filling weight: 900 g

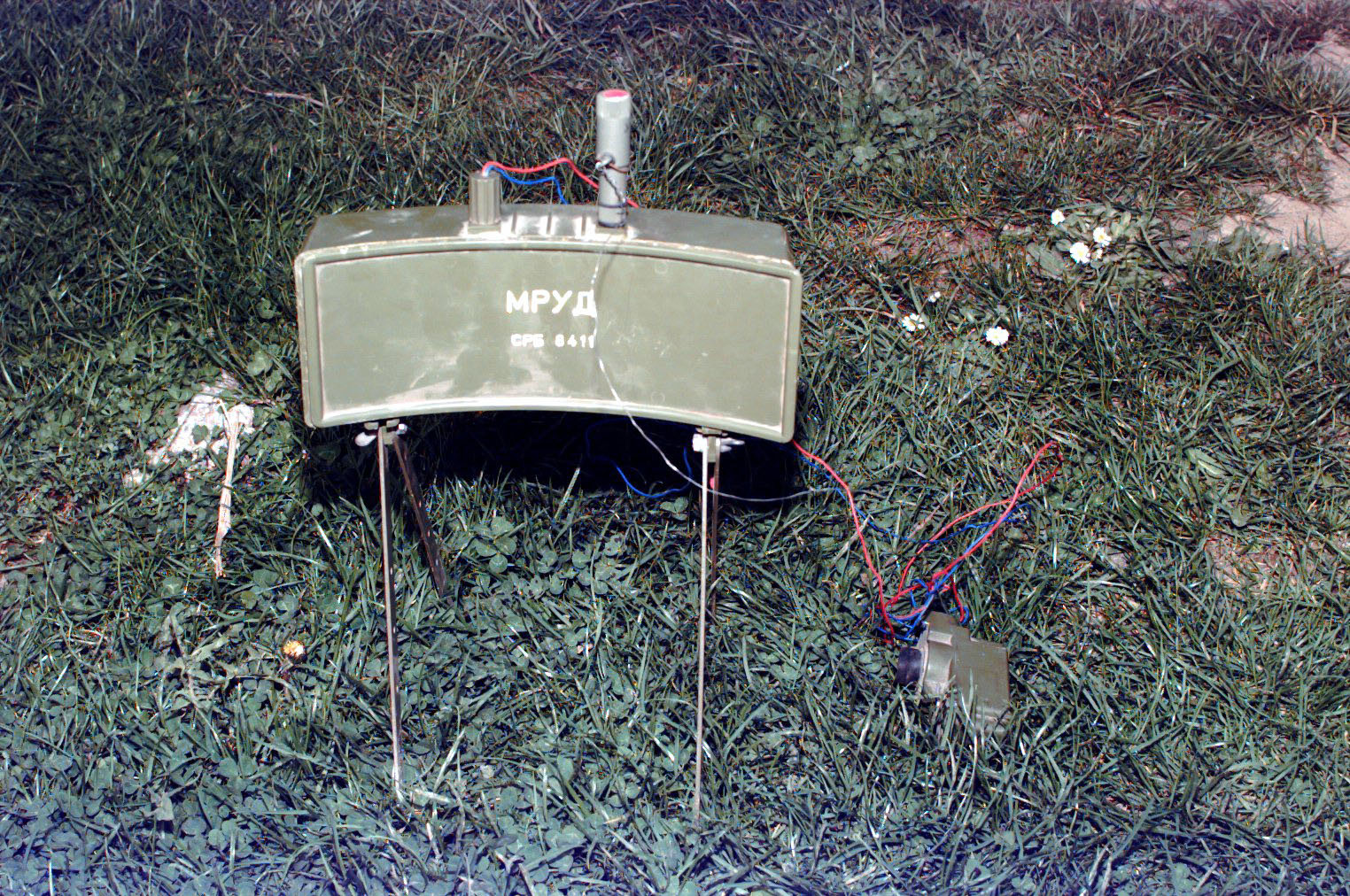
Yugoslav MRUD anti-personnel mine (back, side view)

Yugoslav MRUD anti-personnel mine (front, accessories fitted)

Yugoslav MRUD anti-personnel mine (line drawing)

Yugoslav MRUD anti-personnel mine fielded

The MRUD (Serbian: мина распрскавајућа усмереног дејства, romanized: Mina Rasprskavajuća Usmerenog Dejstva, lit. 'Directed fragmentation mine') is a Yugoslav plastic bodied, convex rectangular directional type anti-personnel mine designed to wound or kill by fragmentation.

== Design ==
The MRUD is broadly similar to the M18A1 Claymore mine. The casing is a light green color with two detonator wells and three crude sight lines on the top and an embossed grid pattern on the front of some early mines. Two detachable metal legs fit in slots on the bottom to secure the mine when it is ground mounted.

The body of the MRUD is waterproof and the mine can be used in temperatures from −30˚ to +50˚ C. The mine body contains 900 grams of TNT-based explosive and 650 5.5-millimeter steel balls. When fired the fragmentation has a lethal arc of 60 degrees and a lethal range of 40–50 meters. The MRUD kit comes packed with a manual inductor, circuit test device and an EK-40-69 electric detonator. The mine can be command detonated from up to 30 meters away using a manual inductor or another electrical power source. The fuse cavities also accept any Serbian booby trap fuse with an M10 × 1 mm including the UMP-1 and UMP-2 pull and the UMNOP-1 multi-function fuse.

The MRUD comes packed in a grey/green colored canvas shoulder bag which also contains the firing cable a circuit tester and a manual inductor. Ten of these sets come packed in a natural wooden crate.

These mines have been encountered mounted high in trees as well as the more conventional ground mounting. The MRUD can be located visually as well as with metal detectors. Depending on the actuation method the MRUD will have a limited resistance to blast overpressure from explosive breaching methods like the Giant Viper and MICLIC.

== Specifications ==
- Mine action: Claymore-type directional fragmentation
- Material: Plastic casing
- Shape: Claymore
- Color: Light green, olive
- Weight: 1500g
- Fuse #1: Command detonated (electrical)
- Fuse #2:
  - UMP-1 Mechanical Pull
  - UMNP-1 Mechanical Pull/Pressure
  - Detonation Cord (det cord) attached to PMA-1/2

== Demining hazards ==
The MRUD is usually command actuated by electric detonator, but it can also be set up for tripwire actuation. In Bosnia and Croatia it was combined with a PMA-2 blast type anti-personnel mine by inserting one end of a length of detonating cord in the detonator cavity of the MRUD and taping the other end of the detonating cord to the bottom of the PMA-2. When the blast mine actuated, the MRUD was actuated as well.

If an insulated wire is encountered, care must be taken to establish control of both ends of the wire before attempting to neutralize the mine. The mine should be approached from a 90˚ angle (never from the front) in order to remain outside of its blast arc. When tracking the route of a tripwire, keep in mind that additional anti-personnel blast mines may have been buried along its length. It is all too easy to concentrate on following the tripwire, forgetting what may lie concealed underneath it.
