= Mini MS-803 mine =

South African Claymore anti-personnel mine

Mini MS-803
- Type: Directional fragmentation anti-personnel mine
- Place of origin: South Africa

The Mini MS-803 is a small South African produced Claymore type landmine.

== Design ==
The design is very simple, with a convex brown polystyrene case containing a PE9 plastic explosive charge with three hundred 6 x 8 millimeter cylindrical steel fragments embedded into it. The mine is supported by two pairs of wire legs, which can be used to stack the mines.

On the top of the mine is a small hole for inserting a detonator, which is surrounded with a PETN booster charge.

The mine is normally used with an S4 electrical detonator connected to an M57 electrical firing device which is also used with the similar but larger Shrapnel mine Mk 2. The mine could also be used with MUV type pull detonators and tripwires, but after the Ottawa mine ban treaty South Africa has said that it will not use this mine with victim activated fuses.

When the mine is triggered, the fragments are launched in a 60 degree arc to a lethal range of between 15 and 30 meters. The fragment density is claimed to be two per meter square at 15 meters with the fan of fragments reaching a height of two meters at a range of 30 meters. The fragments have enough energy at 25 meters to penetrate 10 millimeters of pine.

== Specifications ==
- Length: 220 mm
- Height: 70 mm (excluding legs)
- Width: 35 mm
- Weight: 1 kg
- Explosive content 0.46 kg of PE9 plastic explosive surrounding a PETN booster

== Usage ==
It was superseded by the Shrapnel mine Number 2 in South African service. The mine is found in Angola and Mozambique.

== Users ==
- Angola
- Mozambique
- South Africa
