= Pes Patron =

Educational-animated series for children published on YouTube

- Genre: educational
- Based on: Demining of Ukraine; Patron
- Written by: Oleksandra Ruban
- Directed by: Anastasiya Falileyeva
- Country of origin: Ukraine
- Original language: Ukrainian
- No. of seasons: 1
- No. of episodes: 16

Original release
- Release: 7 January 2023 – present

Pes Patron (Ukrainian: Пес Патрон, lit. 'Patron the Dog') is an educational-animated series for children published on YouTube (Patron The Dog, https://www.youtube.com/@patronthedog}). The aim of the series is to educate children to move safely in a war zone where are e.g. land mines and other dangers. One third of the area of Ukraine is considered dangerous to move on during the time of the debut. The series is also meant to give the children something else to think during the time of war. The primary audience are children aged 6 to 8 and older.

The series is directed by Anastasiya Falileyeva and written by Oleksandra Ruban who also came up with the idea of the series. The distribution is handled by Megogo and the opening song is made by a Ukrainian punk-rock band called Karta Svitu. The production of the series was supported by USAID and UNICEF.

A teaser for the series was published on YouTube on December 28, 2022. The first episode came out on January 7, 2023.

The cancellation of USAID grant programs by the Trump administration halted production of the series.

== Plot ==
Patron is a Jack Russell Terrier working for the State Emergency Service of Ukraine as a bomb-sniffing dog. In the series, Patron saves other animals, defuses bombs and fights against things called bubukhi.

In addition Patron has a friend, a cat called Tom, to whom Patron tells about his adventures.
