= MM-1 Minimore =

American landmine explosive

- Type: Directional fragmentation anti-personnel mine
- Place of origin: United States

The MM-1 "Minimore" is a small-sized version of the M18A1 claymore mine, currently manufactured by Arms-Tech Ltd. of Phoenix, Arizona.

== Name ==
The company literature refers to it either as the "MM-1 Directional Command Detonated Mine" or as the "Minimore-1 (MM-1) Miniature Field-Loadable Claymore Mine".

== Design ==
The MM-1 occupies only one third of the volume of an M18A1. Being significantly smaller and lighter than the original, more can be carried at one time (three MM-1 in place of one single M18A1).

The MM-1 produces a narrower arc of fragments than the claymore mine, according to the manufacturer: at 50 feet (15 m) it produces a pattern 16 feet (4.9 m) wide and two feet high, compared with a 50-foot (15 m) wide pattern for the claymore mine at the same distance.
