= PM-79 mine =

Anti-personnel mine

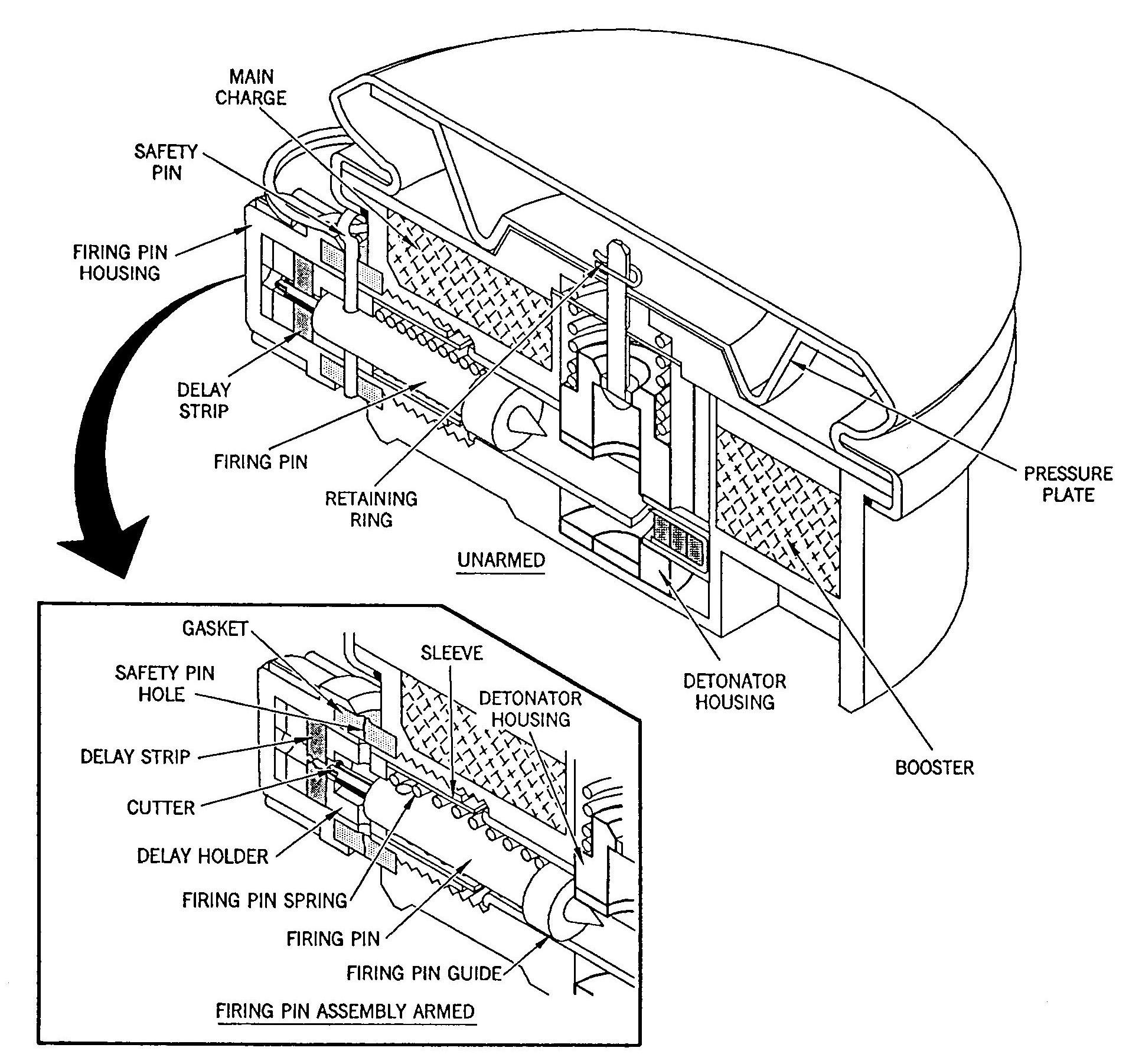
A cutaway of a PM-79 mine.

The PM-79 is a small, circular Bulgarian blast-resistant anti-personnel mine, superficially similar to the Russian PMN. The mine uses a unique trigger design; on the top of the mine, beneath a thin rubber cover is a dish shaped pressure plate. Pressure on the outer rim of the dish shaped plate levers up a central post, which triggers the mine. The mine also incorporates a mechanical arming delay using a pin cutting through a thin lead strip. The mine arms in between two minutes and four hours depending on the temperature.

The mine has been withdrawn from Bulgarian service, although it is sometimes found in parts of Asia.

== Specifications ==
- Diameter: 88.2 to 100 mm (3.47 to 3.94 in)
- Height: 55 mm (2.2 in)
- Weight: 255 g (9.0 oz)
- Explosive content: 78.3 g (2.76 oz) TNT
- Operating pressure: 5 kg (11 lb) or more
