= MOB (landmine) =

The Modular Fragmentation Munition (Russian: Модульный Осколочный Боеприпас, Translit. Modulniy Oskolochniy Boyepripas) is a Russian high-explosive directional anti-personnel mine developed for the Russian Armed Forces.

== Description ==
The MOB is hand-placed plastic-bodied mine that can be command- or victim-activated. The landmine can be assembled in modular form with multiple fragmentation blocks.

The MOB is part of a cased kit which includes up to four MOB mines and various aiming, firing, and mounting accessories.

The rate of detonation is 8,430 m/s at a density of 1.84g/cm^{3}.

== Operational use ==
The MOB first saw use in 2022 during the Russo-Ukrainian War.
