= MON-50 =

Anti-personnel mine

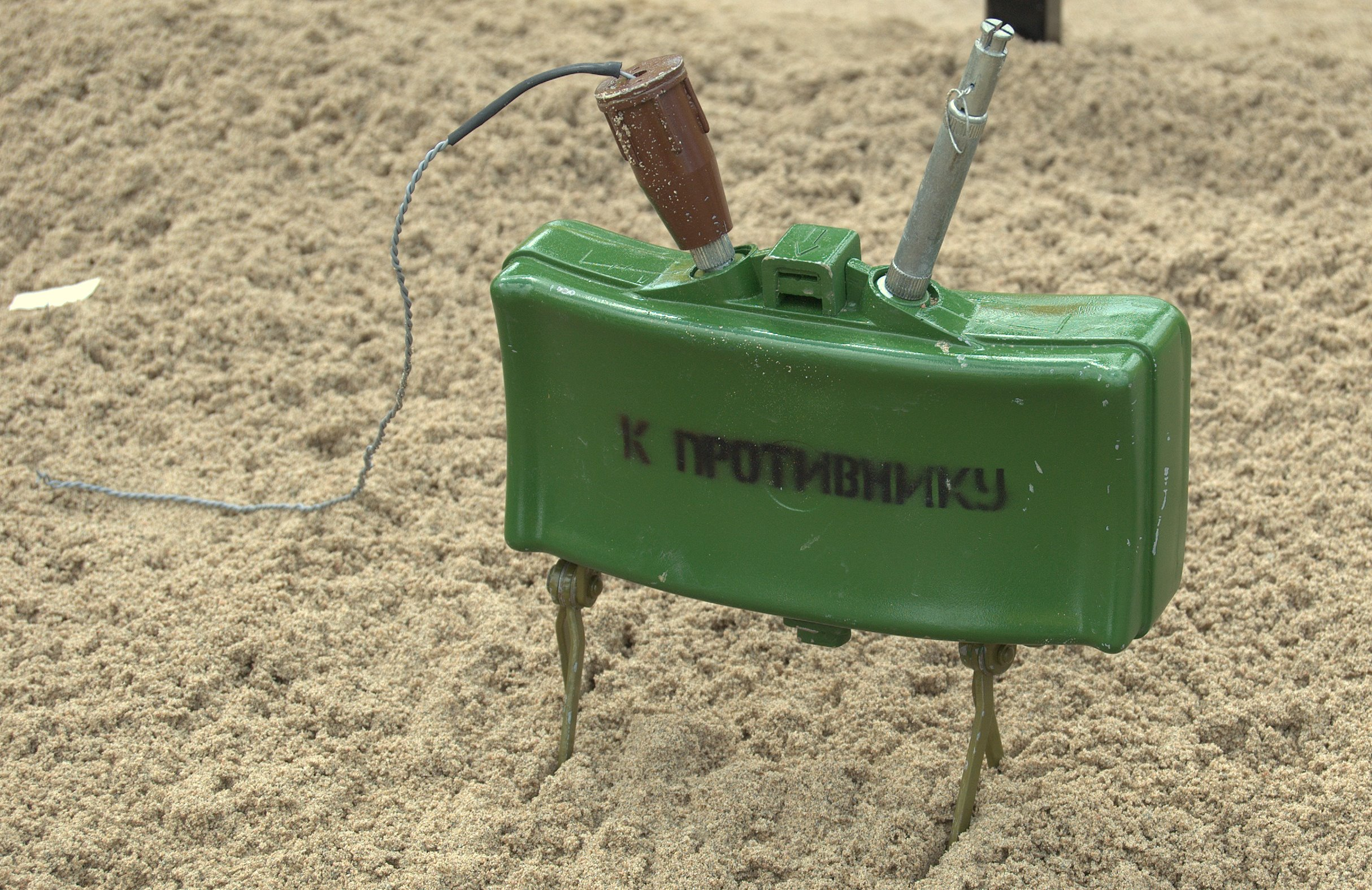
Non-armed MON-50 displayed by the Swedish military's EOD and Demining Centre. Text reads "К ПРОТИВНИКУ" (k protivniku, "towards enemy").

The MON-50 (Russian: МОН-50) is a Soviet rectangular, slightly convex, plastic bodied, directional type of anti-personnel mine designed to wound or kill by explosive fragmentation. It first entered service in 1965 and is a copy of the American M18 Claymore with a few differences. Its name is derived from Russian мина осколочная направленного (mina oskolochnaya napravlennogo), "directional fragmentation mine".

== Design ==
Line drawing of MON-50

Based on the American M18A1 Claymore, the MON-50 has folding scissor type legs for supporting and aiming, but it also has an attachment point on the bottom for connecting a special clamp/spike which can be attached to wood, metal etc. It has a peep sight centered on the top which is flanked by two detonator cavities. The mine contains 700 g of RDX (PVV-5A) to propel approximately 540 or 485 fragments to a lethal range of 50 meters in a 54° arc (spread of 45 meters at 50 meter range). The fragments can be steel balls (540) or short steel rods (485) depending on the variant.

The MON-50 is usually command actuated using a PN manual inductor and an EDP-R electric detonator. It can also be actuated by a variety of booby trap (BT) switches including the MUV series pull; the MVE-72 electric breakwire; or the VP13 seismic controller.

The MON-50 will usually be mounted above ground level on the surface or up in trees to give the greatest dispersion of fragments. It is waterproof and will function effectively from +50 to −50 °C (it can be buried in snow as long as the pack in front of the mine does not exceed 10 cm; any more will greatly reduce its effectiveness).

The mine can be located visually or with metal detectors under most field conditions. Depending on its actuation method, the MON-50 may be resistant to blast overpressure from explosive breaching systems like the Giant Viper and M58 MICLIC.

The MON-50 is currently manufactured in Russia and also manufactured for export in Bulgaria. The MON-50 is widely used in many parts of the world. It comes in a two pouch cloth bandolier which holds all the components for securing and command actuating the mine. It may also come packed in a VKPM-2 set which contains four mines complete with miscellaneous fuzes, control panel and wire.

== Specifications ==
Casing material	Plastic
Weight	2 kg (4.4 lbs)
Fragmentation charge (PVV-5A RDX)	700 gr (1.5 lbs)
Casing length	226 mm (8.9 inches)
Casing width	66 mm
Casing height	90 mm
Length of the sensor target (one-way)	65 meters (213 ft) with fuse MVE-72
Sensor sensitivity	0.3 kg (0.66 lbs)
Horizontal dispersion	54 degree
Width of the affected area	45-54 meters (147.6-177.2 ft)
Height of the affected area	4 meters (13.1 ft)
Temperature usage range	-40 to +50*C (-40 to +138*F)
Preformed fragments	485 balls or 540 rollers
Effective casualty radius	50 m (balls) / 58 m (rollers)
Lethal fragment range	80 m (balls) / 85 m (rollers)
Sources	

Types of fuses:

- Fuse #1: Command detonated using PN manual inductor attached by demolition cable to an EDP-R electric detonator.
- Fuse #2: (one of the following)
  - MUV Series Mechanical Pull
  - MVE-72 Electric Breakwire (battery powered)
  - VP13 Seismic Controller (battery powered)

== Further information and effects ==
The mine has conventional or advanced seismic influence fuzing. It is a hand laid directional fragmentation mine which is normally command actuated (always secure command wires). The MON-50 is known to be used with the VP13 seismic controller which prevents close approach for any clearance operations, or to a variety of BT fuzes.

On detonation, the mine will normally propel lethal fragmentation to a range between 40 and 60 meters, although the actual hazard range for these types of mines can be as high as 300 metres based on U.S. Army tests of the M18A1 Claymore (this is directly in front of the mine, fragmentation range and density drop off to 125 meters to the sides and rear of these mines).

== See also ==
- MON-90
- MON-100
- MON-200
