= MON-100 =

Sovietic anti-personnel mines

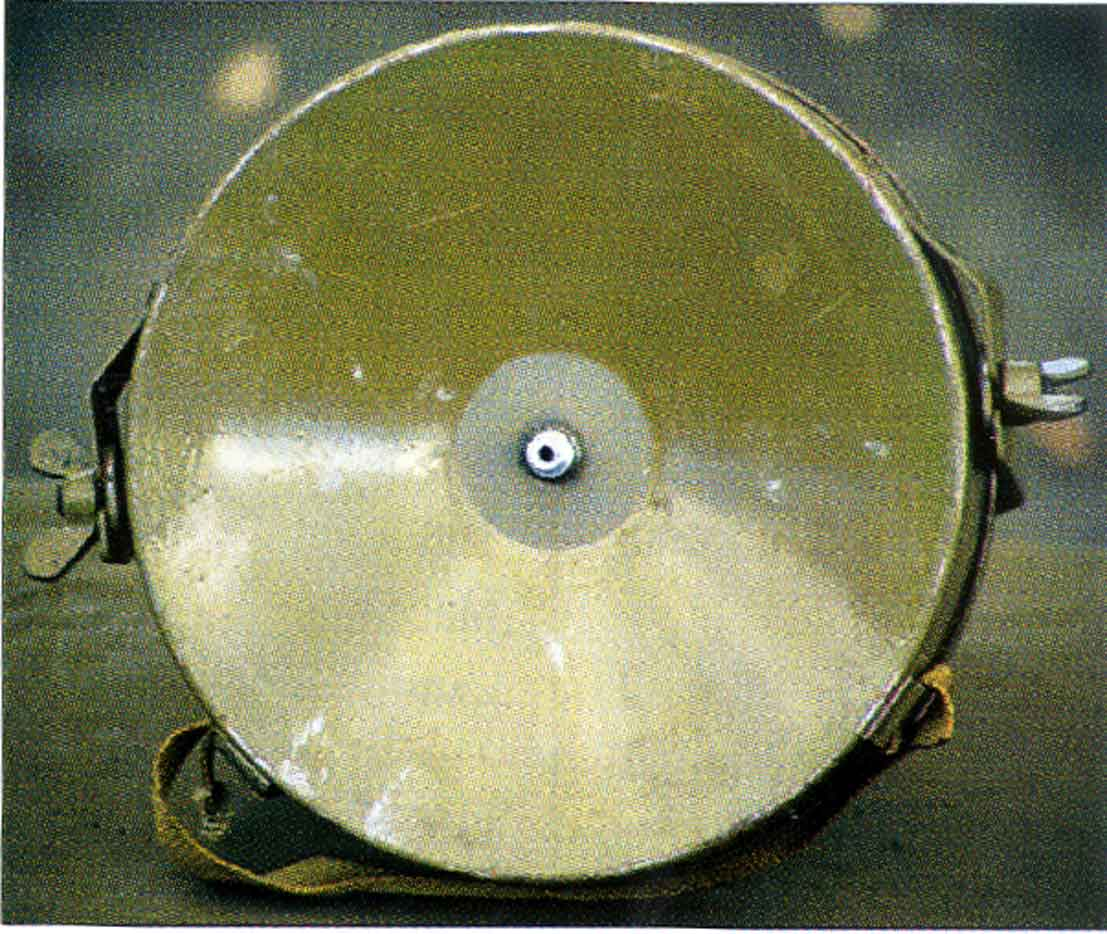
MON-100 Landmine

The MON-100 is a circular, sheet metal bodied, directional type of anti-personnel mine designed and manufactured in the early 1960s by the Soviet Union. It is designed to wound or kill by fragmentation and resembles a large bowl.

The mine is reported to be deployed in Angola, Mozambique, South Africa and Zambia.

== Design ==
The MON-100 mine body has a smooth, well finished appearance with a webbing handle mounted on the upper edge. It is usually attached to a mounting shackle by wing nuts on either side of the mine body (the shackle is connected to a spike for securing the mine to buildings, trees etc.). The concave face of the mine has a detonator cavity in its center (this is the side aimed at the target).

The mine contains 2 kg of explosive to propel 450 steel rod fragments to a lethal range of 100 m (thus the "100" in the name), at maximum range the spread of the fragmentation is 9.5 m. The mine alone weighs 5 kg but with the shackle and mounting spike the weight is 7.53 kg. The MON 100 can be command actuated using a PN manual inductor attached by demolition cable to an EDP-R electric detonator. It can also be actuated by a variety of booby trap (BT) switches including:

- MUV series pull
- MVE-72 electric breakwire
- VP13 seismic controller.

The MON-100 will usually be mounted above ground level on the surface or up in trees to give the greatest dispersion of fragments. The mine can be located visually or with metal detectors under most field conditions. Depending on its actuation method the MON-100 may be resistant to blast overpressure from explosive breaching systems like the Giant Viper and M58 MICLIC. The mine is also produced for export to Poland.

== Specifications ==
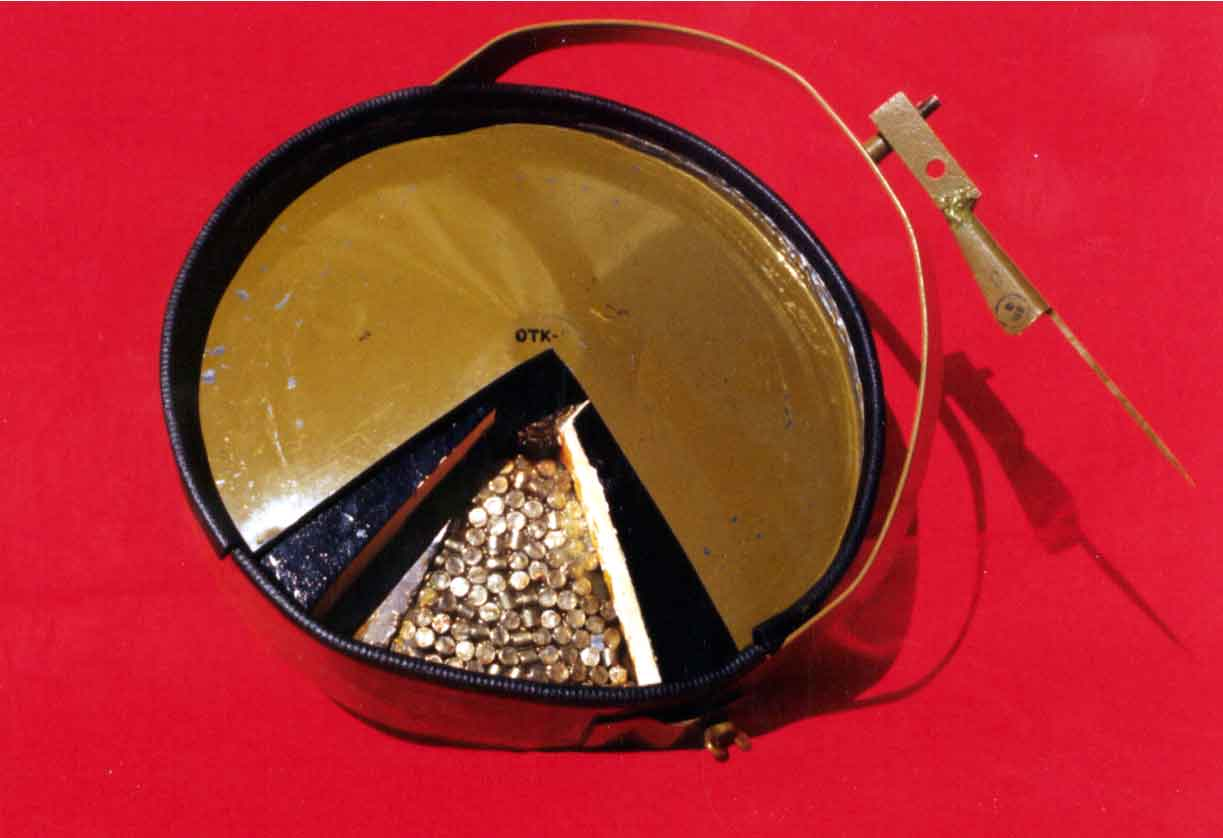
MON-100 cutaway to show components

- Country of origin: Soviet Union
- Mine action:
- Material: steel
- Shape: Circular
- Colour: Green, olive
- Total weight: 5 kg
- Explosive content: 2 kg TNT
- Operating pressure (kg):
- Length: n/a
- Width: 82.5 mm
- Height: n/a
- Diameter: 236 mm
- Preformed fragments: 400 rollers, 10 mm each
- Effective casualty range: 116 m
- Effective casualty radius at 100 m: 6.5–9.5 m
- Lethal fragment range: 160 m
- Lethal fragment range to the rear and sides: up to 30 m (the bracket spike may project 300–400 m to the rear)
- Operating temperature: −50 to +50 °C
- Fuse #1: Command detonated using PN manual inductor attached by demolition cable to an EDP-R electric detonator
- Fuse #2:
  - MUV Series Mechanical Pull or
  - MVE-72 Electric Breakwire (battery powered) or
  - VP13 Seismic Controller (battery powered).

== National copies ==
- MDH-10 Vietnam, a copy of the MON-100
- KN-10 Cambodia, a simplified version of the MDH-10

== See also ==
- MON-50 a smaller Claymore-style mine.
- MON-90
- MON-200 and a larger version of the MON-100 mine.
