= MON-200 =

Anti-personnel mine

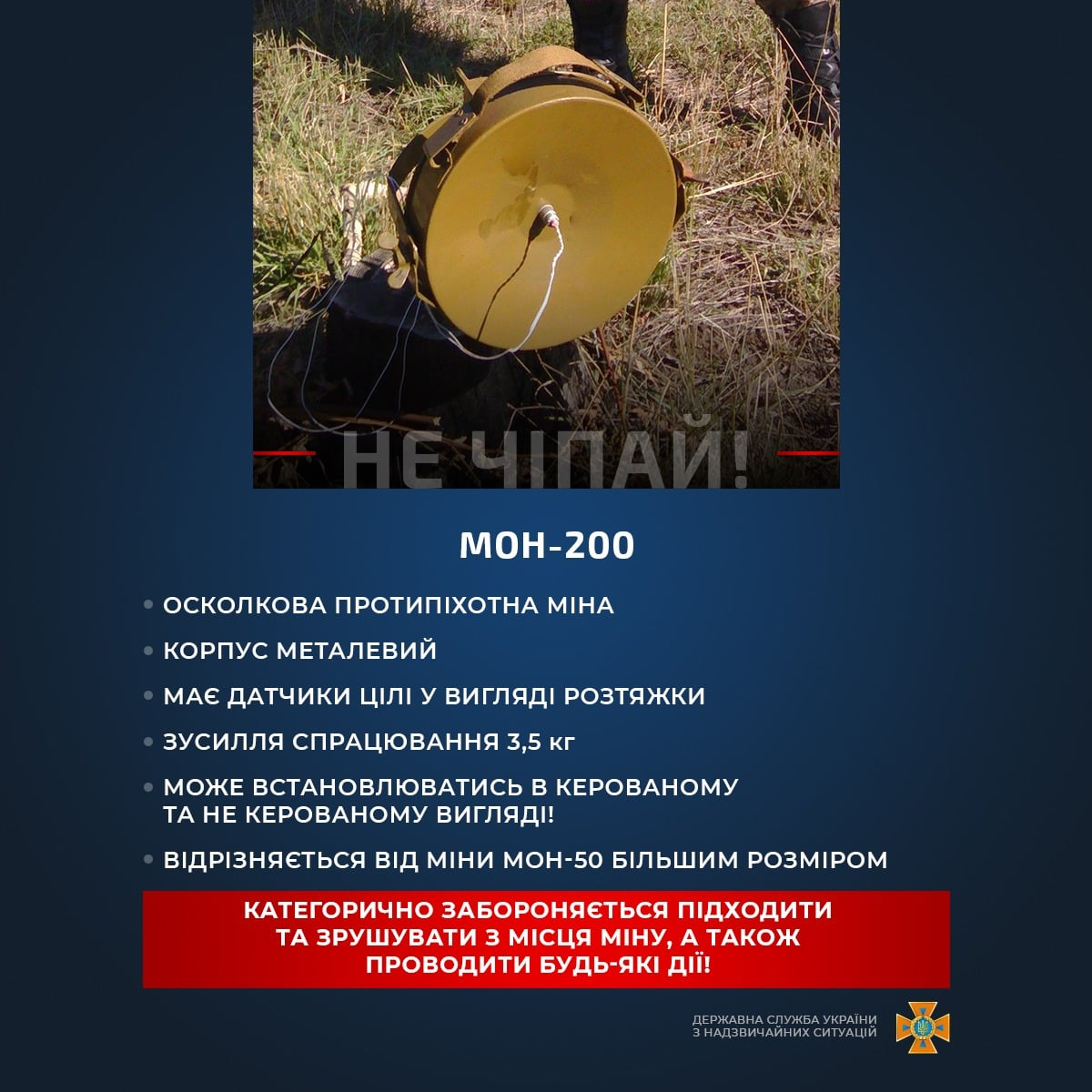
A Ukrainian MON-200 mine

The MON-200 is a directional type anti-personnel mine designed and manufactured in Soviet Union. It is an enlarged version of the MON-100 mine.

Because of its large size, this directional fragmentation mine can also be used against light-skinned vehicles and helicopters.

Number 200 in the code name means 200 meters of effective distance for seriously damaging people.

== Specifications ==
- Mine type: Anti-personnel
- Mine action: n/a
- Material: steel
- Shape: Circular
- Colour: Green, olive
- Total weight: 25 kg
- Explosive content: 12 kg TNT
- Operating pressure (kg): n/a
- Length: n/a
- Width: 130 mm
- Height: n/a
- Diameter: 434 mm
- Preformed fragments: 900 rollers, 10 mm each
- Continuous-hit distance: 220 m
- Continuous-hit width at 100 m: 10.5–14 m
- Lethal fragment range: 240 m
- Lethal fragment range to the rear and sides: up to 50 m (the bracket may project 300–400 m to the rear)
- Operating temperature: −50 to +50 °C

== See also ==
- MON-50
- MON-90
- MON-100
