= PMN mine =

Series of Soviet anti-personnel mines

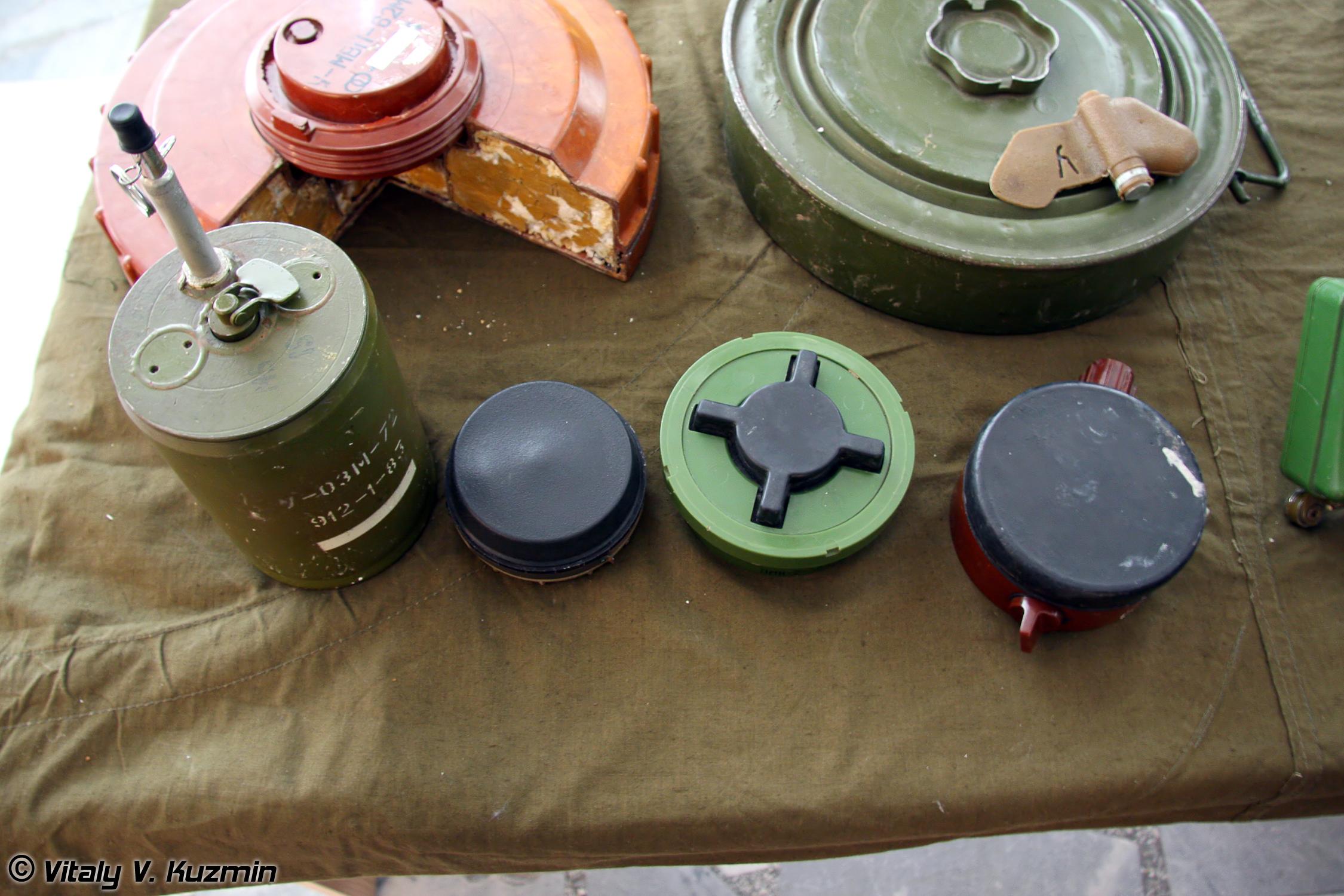
Front row, from left to right: OZM-72, PMN-4, PMN-2 and PMN-1 antipersonnel mines. The two larger mines are Soviet TM-62P2 and TM-46 (with a PFM-1 lying on it) antitank mines.

The PMN (Russian: противопехотная мина нажимная, romanized: protivopekhotnaya mina nazhimnaya, lit. 'anti-infrantry pressure-activated mine') series of blast anti-personnel mines were designed and manufactured in the Soviet Union. They are one of the most widely used and commonly found devices during demining operations. They are sometimes nicknamed "black widow" because of their dark casings.

== PMN-1 ==
The design of the PMN-1 mine dates from the late 1950s. It is particularly deadly because it contains an unusually large explosive filling when compared to most other anti-personnel landmines. For comparison, most anti-personnel blast mines (e.g. the VS-50) contain around 50 g (1.8 oz) of high explosive, which typically destroys all or part of a victim's foot. In marked contrast, a PMN-1 contains 200 g (7.1 oz) of explosive which can easily destroy a victim's entire leg (frequently requiring amputation high above the knee) in addition to inflicting severe injuries on the adjacent limb, which may also require some form of amputation due to blast injury. The majority of anti-personnel mine victims (e.g. those who step on an M14 mine containing 29 g (1 oz) of explosive) have a very high probability of survival, though inevitably they suffer permanent disability regarding their gait. However, the amount of explosive inside a PMN-1 mine is so large that the risk of victims dying is significantly greater and, assuming that they survive their injuries, the degree of disability inflicted is much more severe.

These mines are palm sized and cylindrical in shape. The PMN-1 has a bakelite case (brown or black in colour) with a black rubber pressure-plate and contains TNT explosive.

The PMN-1 mine is armed by removing a steel ring-pull at the end of the horizontal fuze. When in position, the pin on the end of the ring-pull holds a spring-loaded striker back from the stab-detonator. Pulling out the ring-pull starts an arming delay, which requires a thin steel wire (held under tension by the spring-loaded striker) to cut through a small strip of lead. The process of cutting through the lead strip takes between 2 and 12 minutes, depending on ambient temperature. After the wire has completely cut through the lead strip, the spring-loaded striker is freed and slides forward a few millimetres before stopping, blocked by the sliding gate of the pressure plate mechanism. At this point the mine is fully armed i.e. the only thing holding back the spring-loaded striker from the stab-detonator is a weak creep-spring on the pressure plate mechanism. Subsequently, any downward pressure on the pressure plate (i.e. when someone steps on the mine) overcomes the upward pressure of the creep-spring and pushes down the sliding gate that holds back the spring-loaded striker. This action frees the striker which flips forward into the stab detonator, firing both it and the adjacent tetryl booster which triggers detonation of the main TNT explosive filling. It is not a blast resistant mine.

- Height: 53 mm (2.1 in)
- Diameter: 110 mm (4.3 in)
- Main charge weight: 200 g (7.1 oz) TNT (initiated by a 9 gram tetryl booster)
- Total weight: 550 g (1.21 lb)
- Pressure plate diameter: 100 mm
- Operating pressure: 8–25 kg
- Operating temperature: −40 to +50 °C
- Fuze: MD-9 (stab-sensitive)
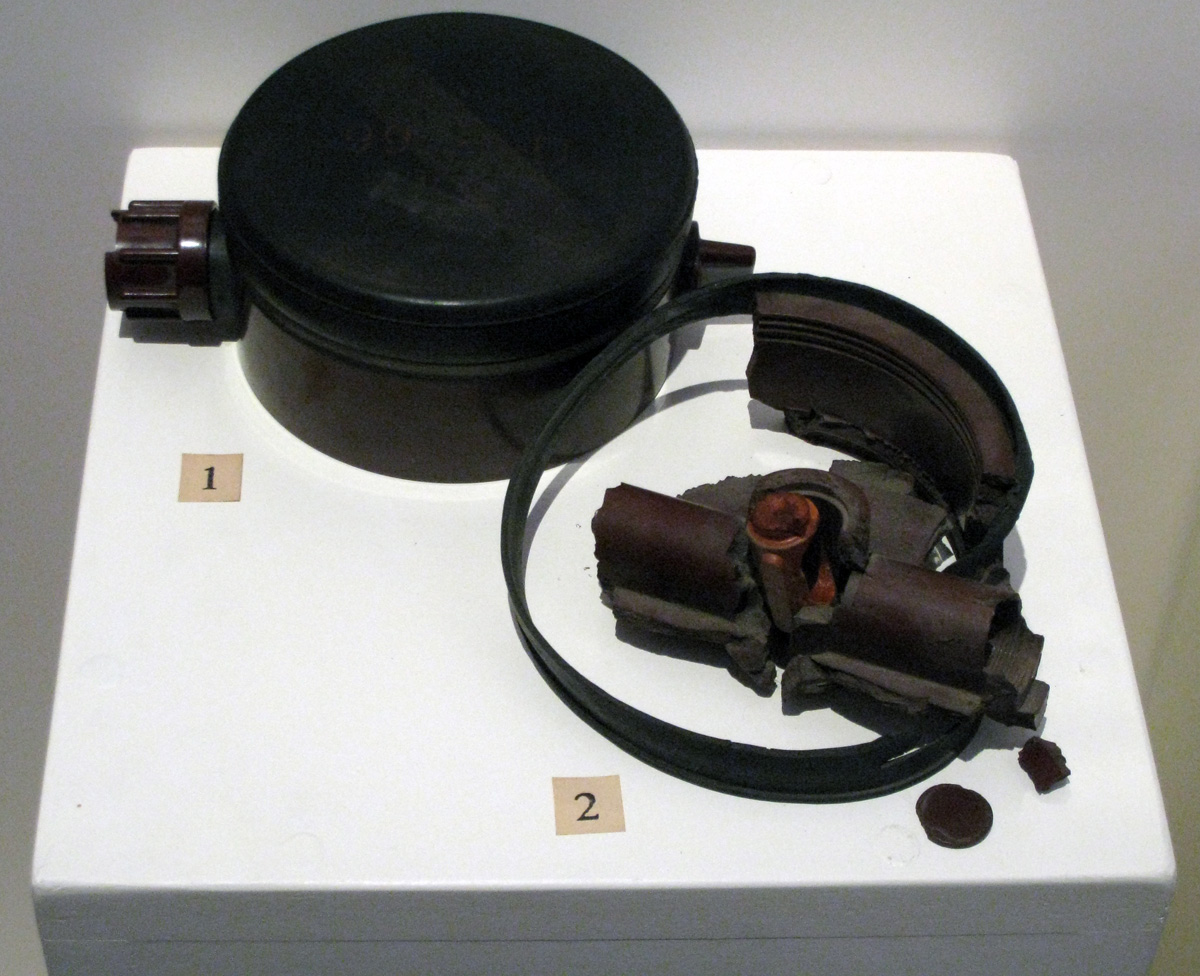
Two PMN-1 mines: the first example is complete, the other shows the appearance of a PMN-1 after it has detonated

The striker assembly from a PMN-1 showing the lead-shear arming delay. This assembly would be located under the round knurled cap on the right in the previous image

== PMN-2 ==
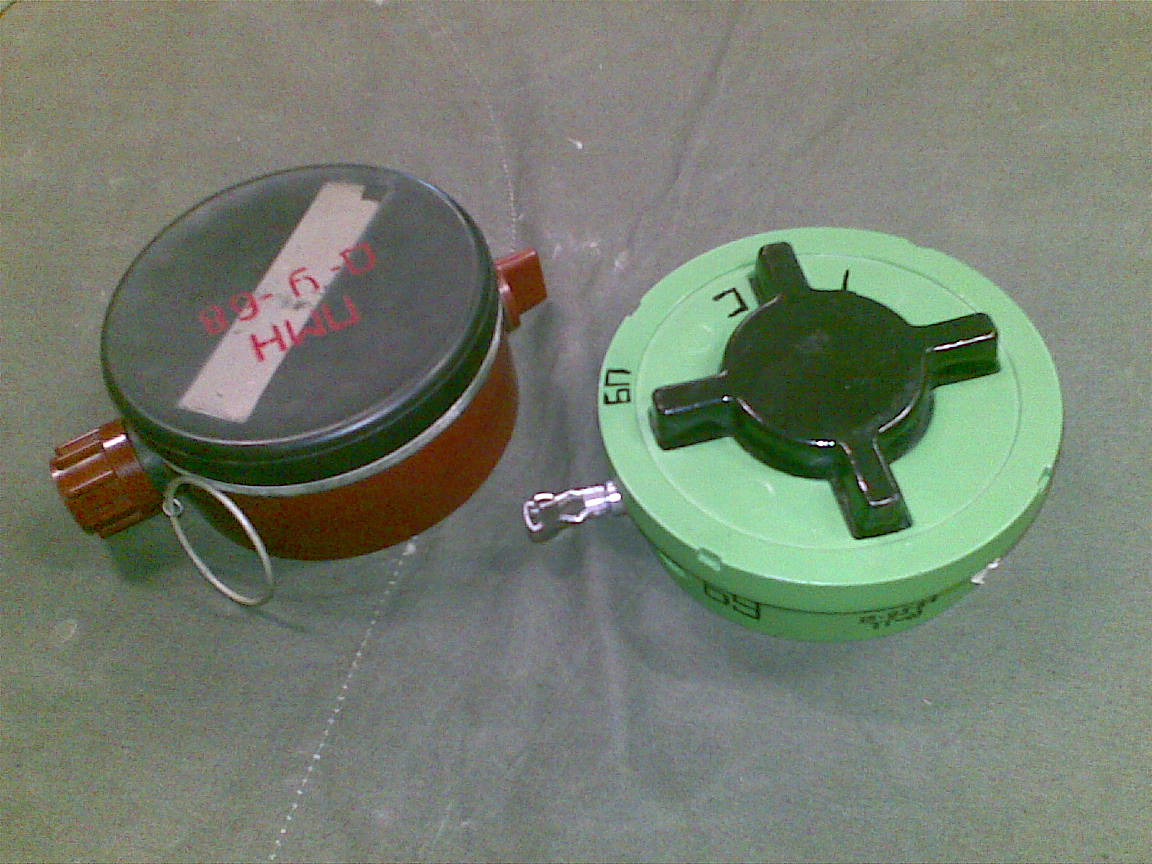
PMN-1 and PMN-2 mines. Both have arming pins in place, which means the fuze mechanisms are not armed

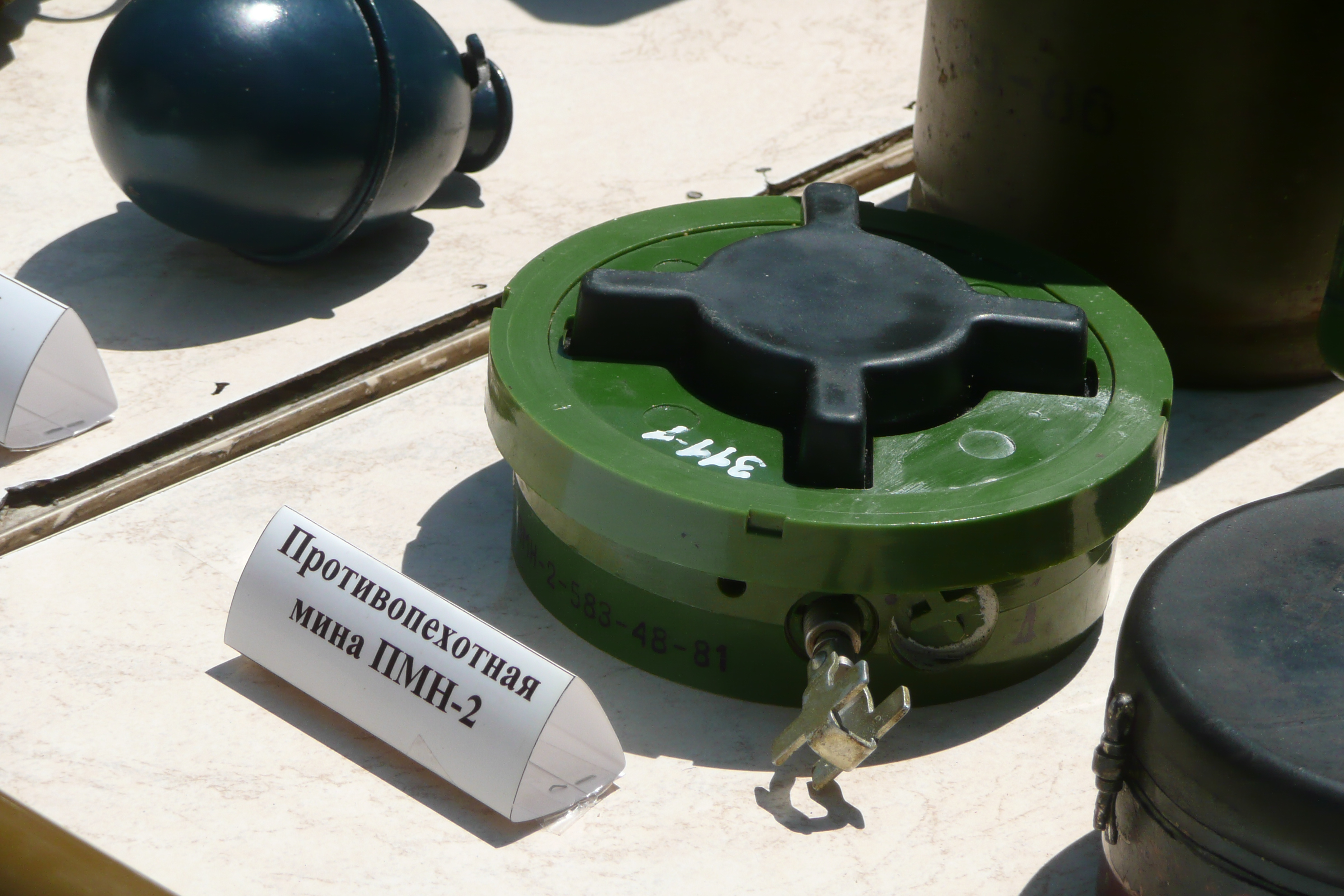
PMN-2 mine with its arming pin in situ. This mine has not been armed

The PMN-2 mine casing is made from injection-molded plastic. In general, the color is leaf-green, but occasionally brown examples may be encountered. The top of the mine has a black rubber X-shaped pressure plate. The filling is an RDX/TNT based explosive that is quite similar to Composition B. As with the PMN-1, the PMN-2 has an unusually large explosive filling when compared to many other anti-personnel landmines.

One significant difference between the PMN-1 and PMN-2 is that the PMN-2 (a mid-1970s design) contains a more modern fuze with an integral baffle beneath the pressure plate. This and the X-shaped design of the pressure plate makes the PMN-2 much more resistant to traditional explosive mine countermeasures, which use sudden overpressure to detonate mines. It can therefore be regarded as a blast resistant mine. In contrast, the PMN-1 (a 1950s design) can successfully be cleared by such methods.

The PMN-2 fuze features an arming delay of 30–300 seconds. When the arming key is rotated and removed from the mine, the arming pin is sheared. This allows the air-bellows inside the mine to be inflated by the compression spring, which in turn lifts a "safety" bar from the path of the slide, unblocking its travel. The arming delay on a PMN-2 is significantly shorter than that of a PMN-1.

The PMN-2 mine played an important role in the 2025 Cambodian-Thai border crisis when PMN-2 mines detonated and injured Thai soldiers on two separate occasions resulting in a 5 day conflict.

- Height: 54 mm
- Diameter: 120 mm
- Main charge weight: 100 g TG-40 (RDX/TNT)
- Total weight: 400 g
- Pressure plate diameter: 97 mm
- Sensitivity: 5–25 kgf
- Arming delay: 30–300 s, pneumatic
- Operating temperature: −40 to +50 °C
- Fuze: integral mechanical fuze with a pneumatic arming delay

== PMN-3 ==
- Weight: 0.6 kg
- Explosive: 0.08 kg A-IX-1
- Diameter: 122 mm
- Height: 54 mm
- Body: plastic
- Delayed arming: 8.5±1.5 min, electronic
- Self-destruct: 12 hours, or 1, 2, 4 or 8 days
- Anti-removal: actuates when the mine is tilted by more than 90°
- Sensitivity: 5–25 kgf
- Operating temperature: −30 to +50 °C
- Power source: 7RTs53U battery

== PMN-4 ==
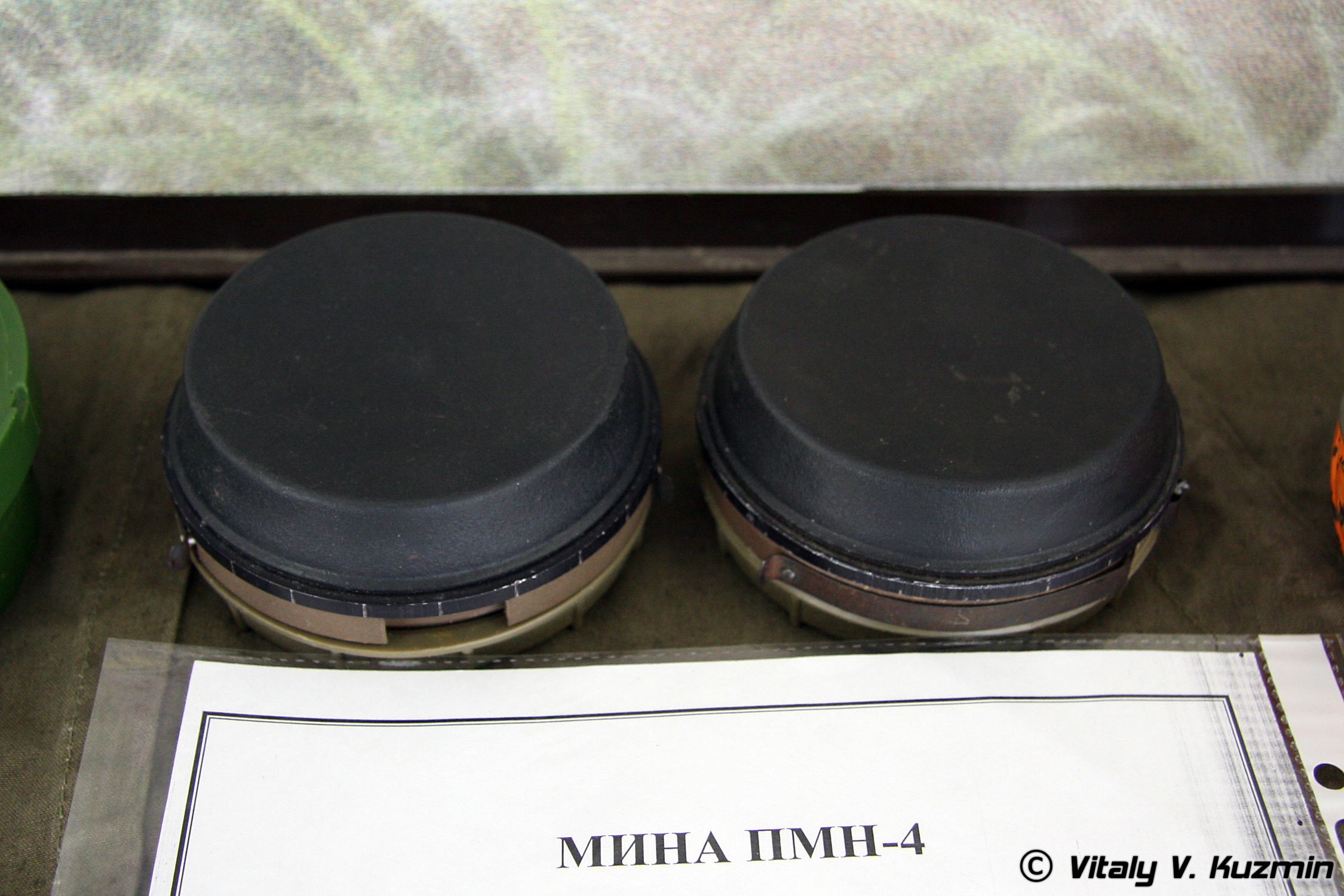
A pair of PMN-4 mines

The PMN-4 is a delay-armed, pressure-fired blast-mine. The pressure-plate is black and the body is reddish-brown or khaki. The black rubber pressure-plate has a plastic pressure "spider" concealed underneath, shaped like flower-petals. The diameter of the mine is 95mm and the height is 42 mm. The explosive charge weight is 50 g of TNT. The total weight of the mine is 300 grams. PMN-4 mines contain a significant amount of metal components, so they are readily detectable with a mine detector. Details of the fuze mechanism are scarce, though given that the PMN-4 was designed during the early 1980s, it is logical to assume that the fuze is more sophisticated and/or reliable than the fuze in the PMN-2 (a mid-1970s design) to compensate for having a smaller explosive filling with significantly reduced destructive power. Similarly, the PMN-4 is almost certainly a blast resistant mine due to the design of the flower-shaped pressure "spider" under the pressure-plate. Cross-sectional diagrams of the PMN-4 showing its components support the view that the PMN-4 is a more sophisticated design than the PMN-2. Examples of the PMN-4 have been encountered in Ukraine and Southern Syria.

- Height: 42 mm
- Diameter: 95 mm
- Main charge weight: 50 g TNT
- Arming delay: 1–40 min, depending on ambient temperature
- Pin extraction force: 5 kgf
- Body: plastic
- Operating temperature: −40 to +50 °C
- Operational life: 1 year
- Total weight: 300 g
- Actuation force: 5–15 kg

== Render-safe procedure ==
It is considered extremely dangerous to disarm PMN mines by removing the fuze, unless they have only recently been laid and are in good condition. Even if this is the case, what appears to be a standard PMN-1 mine may in fact be the PMN-3 or MS-3 versions, which feature an integral anti-handling device which is specifically designed to kill deminers. In any case it is very easy to boobytrap a standard PMN mine by attaching a pull-fuze to it, or by placing an ML-7 pressure-release antihandling device or an ML-8 underneath. Therefore, the standard render-safe procedure for PMN mines is to destroy them in situ using a small explosive charge.

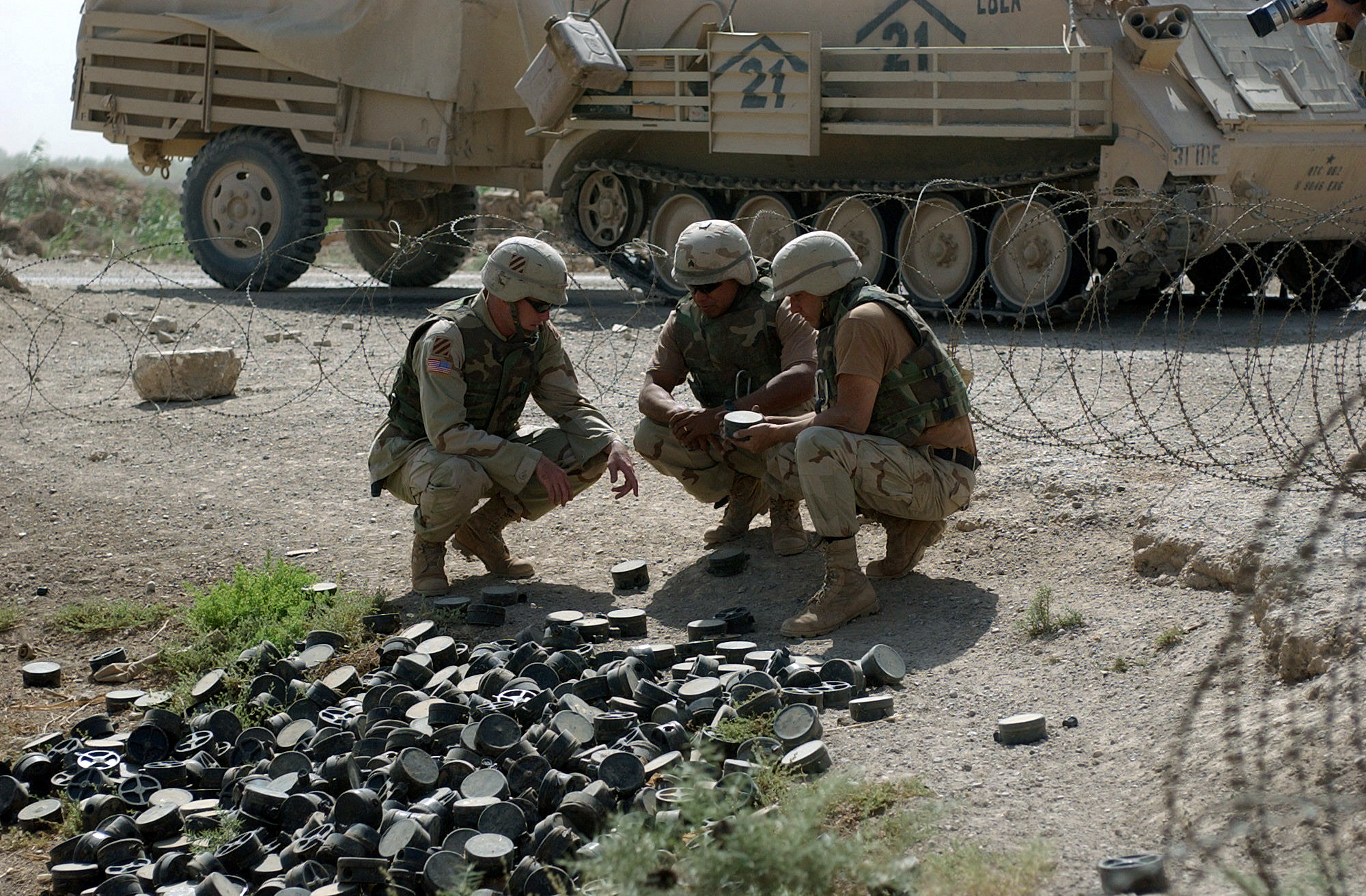
PMN-1 type mines found in Iraq (2003)

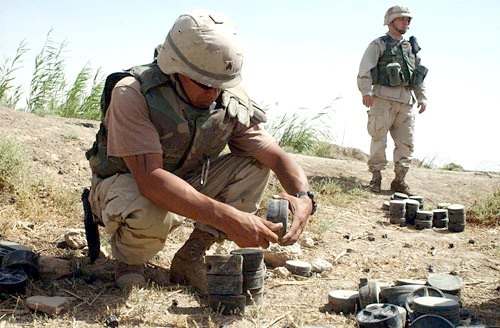
U.S. Army soldier with various PMN-1 mines near Fallujah, Iraq.

== Variants ==
- Type 58: Chinese copy of the PMN-1.
- MM 2: Burmese copy of the PMN-1 used in Myanmar.
- Gyata 64: Hungarian copy of the PMN-1.
- PM-79 mine: Bulgarian variant of the PMN-1.
- MS-3: Has existed since at least 1973. It looks similar to the PMN-1, but has a small "blister" in the centre of the pressure-plate, incorporating a spring-loaded, pressure-release anti-handling device. The explosive content is 310 grams of TNT. The total weight of a MS-3 is 630 g. An MS-3 requires a minimum load of between 5 and 6 kg on the "blister" to prevent detonation. As a result, armed MS-3 mines can be encountered under some sort of heavy object, such as beneath an OZM bounding mine or sometimes an anti-tank mine to act as an anti-handling device. Detonation of an MS-3 under an anti-tank mine may cause sympathetic detonation of the larger munition. An MS-3 could also be used as a conventional boobytrap device without being buried, for example deliberately planted inside a building or a vehicle with some form of weight on top such as a suitcase.
- PMN-3: looks similar to the PMN-2, but incorporates a battery-operated tilt-switch anti-handling device designed to kill/wound deminers. The explosive content is 80g phlegmatized RDX i.e. RDX and paraffin wax. The total weight of the PMN-3 is 600g. This mine has been encountered in Chechnya.

== See also ==
- Land mine
- Satchel charge
