= PDM (series of amphibious mines) =

Soviet weapon system

The PDM amphibious mines are series of Soviet anti-vehicle mines that could be used on or in beaches, rivers, lakes and shallow coastal waters up to five meters deep.

== PDM-1 ==
The PDM-1 has a hemispherical steel case, which is anchored to a heavy steel base. It is normally deployed in water one or two meters deep, and has a central fixing point for a tilt rod. Two men can lay a single mine in 10 to 20 minutes. The mine uses a VPDM-1M tilt rod fuse with an MD-10 detonator.

== PDM-1M ==
The PDM-1M is almost identical to the PDM-1 only having a booster charge to ensure detonation.

=== Bulgarian PDM-1M ===
A Bulgarian version of the PDM-1M exists that is substantially developed from the original it uses a plastic cased mine, with a concrete base and a programmable fuse. The fuse can either be of the electro-mechanical tilt rod type, or a magnetic influence fuse. All the fuzes incorporate a 15-minute arming delay. The mine can self-neutralize or self-destruct after a programmed period of between 1 and 45 days.

The mine can be mechanically laid and recovered, and can operate in 0.8 to 2 meters of water.

== PDM-2 ==
The PDM-2 has a spherical case. The mine has a large base plate, which it is fixed to by a pole, and four suspension wires. It uses a VPDM-2 tilt rod fuse, and can be used in water from 2.4 to 3.8 meters deep.

=== Bulgarian PDM-2M ===
The PDM-2M is a Bulgarian mine - it uses a similar fuzing system to the Bulgarian PDM-1M, but incorporates a much larger main charge.

== PDM-6 ==
The PDM-6 is similar to the PDM-1M, except that it fitted with a secondary fuse well for an anti-handling device on the base, as well as three fuse wells on the top for tilt rod fuzes. The tilt fuzes can be set for contact detonation or to trigger once they reach a certain deflection.

== Specifications ==
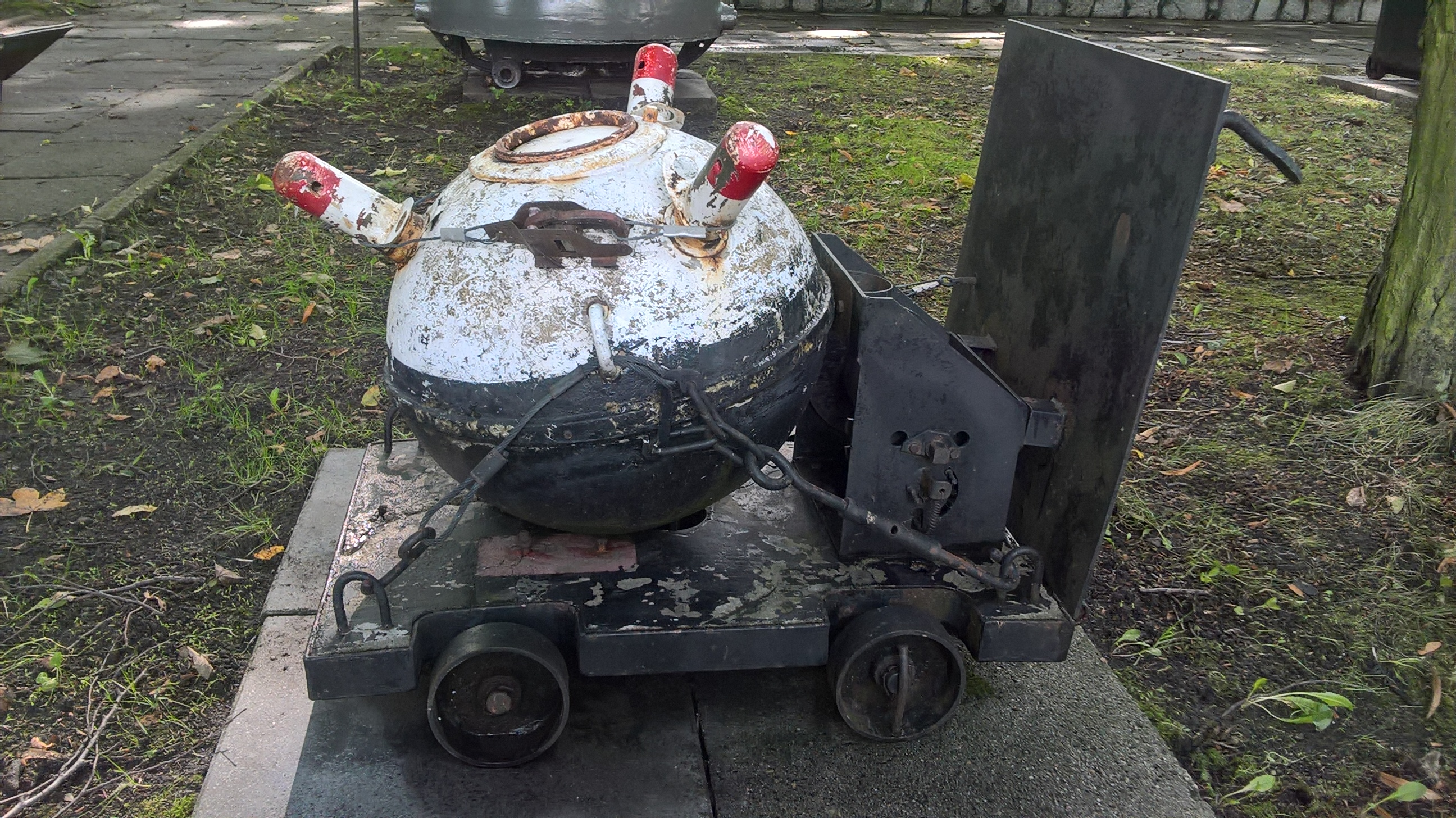
Mine PDM-3Ja

Mine	Diameter	Height	Weight	Explosive content	Operating pressure
PDM-1M	0.8 m	1 m	60 kg	10 kg of TNT	18–26 kg at a tilt of 10–15°
PDM-1M; Bulgarian	0.3 m (approx)	800 mm (with contact fuse); 450 mm (with magnetic influence fuse)	15 kg (mine); 85 kg (mine and base)	12 kg of TNT	variable or magnetic influence
PDM-2	stand 2×2 m	1.4 m (low stand); 2.1–2.7 m (high stand)	100 kg (low stand) or 135 kg (high stand)	15 kg of TNT	40–50 kg at a tilt of 10–15°
PDM-2M; Bulgarian	490 mm (warhead); 1.05 m (anchor)		110 kg (overall); 28.5 kg (main charge)	16 kg of TNT	variable or magnetic influence
PDM-6	0.5 m	0.25 m	47.5 kg (mine and base)	28 kg of TNT or PETN	variable

Soviet PDM-1M: steel body; target-sensor height 0.7 m; emplacement depth 1.1–2 m; target-sensor depth 0.1–1 m below the water surface; operating temperature 0 to +30 °C.

Soviet PDM-2: steel body; target-sensor depth below the water surface 0.3–1.7 m on the high stand and 0.1–1 m on the low stand; operating temperature 0 to +30 °C.
