= 128th Regiment =

128th Regiment may refer to:

- 128th Field Artillery Regiment
- 128th Infantry Regiment (United States)
- 128th Light Anti-Aircraft Regiment, Royal Artillery
- 128th Pioneers
- 128th Regiment of Foot

== American Civil War regiments ==
- 128th Illinois Infantry Regiment
- 128th Indiana Infantry Regiment
- 128th New York Infantry Regiment
- 128th Ohio Infantry Regiment
- 128th Pennsylvania Infantry Regiment
- 128th United States Colored Infantry Regiment

== See also ==
- 128th Brigade (disambiguation)
- 128th (disambiguation)
