= Bedford MW =

British WWII truck

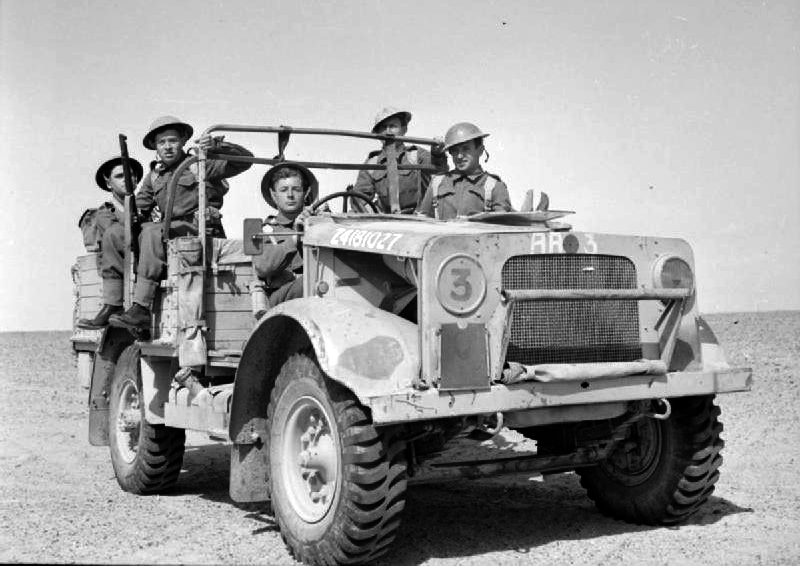
- Bedford MWD 15cwt truck with Rhodesian troops of the 60th King's Royal Rifles, Western Desert, 1942.
- Type: General service truck
- Place of origin: United Kingdom

Service history
- In service: 1939–late 1950s
- Used by: British Army, Royal Air Force & Royal Navy
- Wars: Second World War

Production history
- Designer: Bedford
- Designed: 1937
- Manufacturer: Bedford
- No. built: 65,995

Specifications
- Mass: 2.1 long tons (2.1 t)
- Length: 14 ft 4 in (4.37 m)
- Width: 6 ft 6 in (1.98 m)
- Height: 7 ft 6 in (2.29 m)
- Crew: 2
- Engine: Six-cylinder inline Bedford OHV 210 cu in (3.5 L) petrol 72 bhp (54 kW) at 3,000rpm
- Payload capacity: 15 long cwt (760 kg)
- Drive: Wheeled 4x2
- Transmission: 4 forward, 1 reverse
- Suspension: Live axles on semi-elliptical multi leaf springs
- Maximum speed: 40 mph (64 km/h)
- References: Chris Bishop & Ware

The Bedford MW was a general service truck manufactured by Bedford for use by the British Armed Forces during the Second World War.

== Design ==
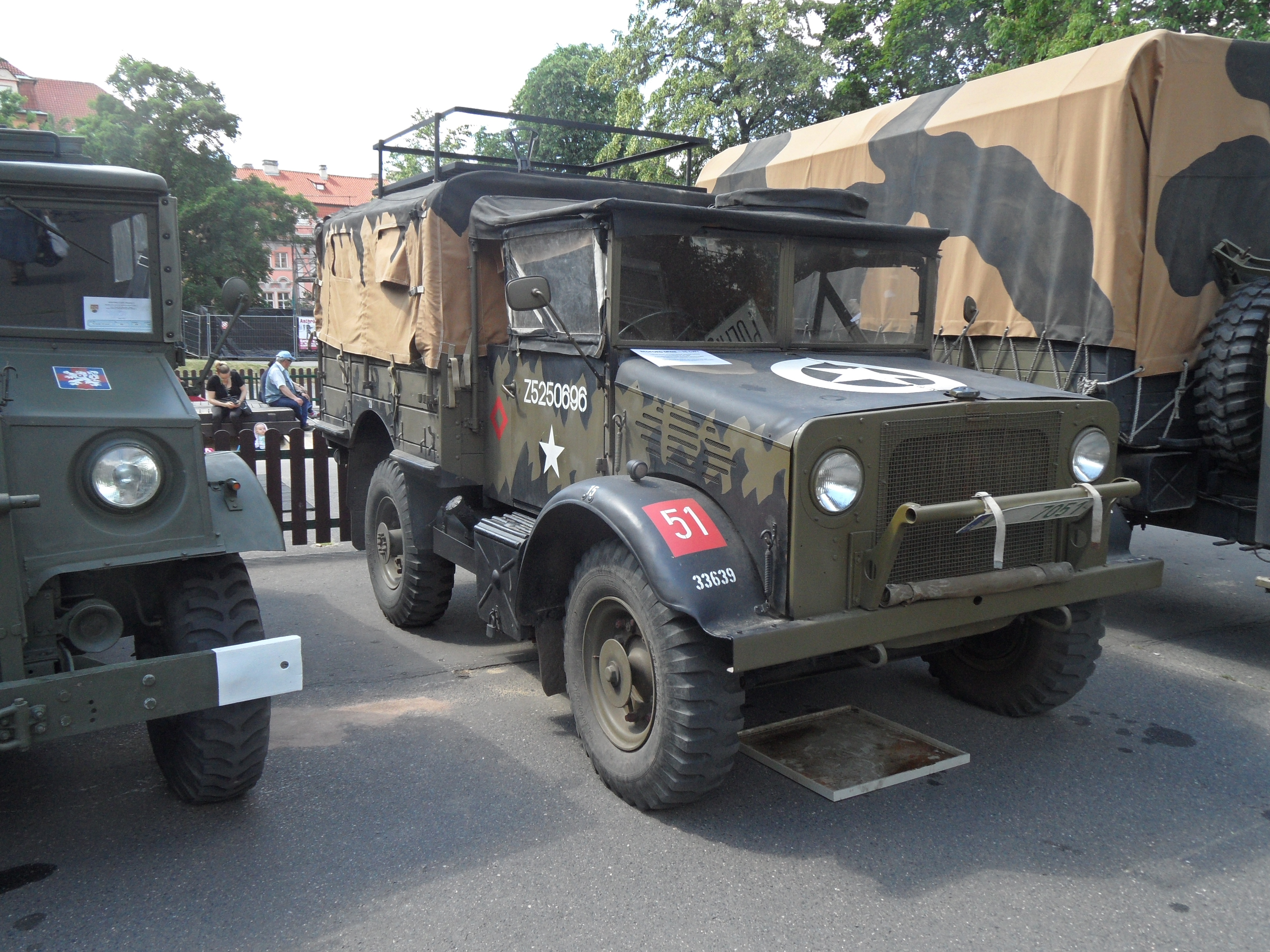
Bedford MWR in camouflage of 1st Czechoslovak Armoured Brigade on the 75th Anniversary of Operation Anthropoid

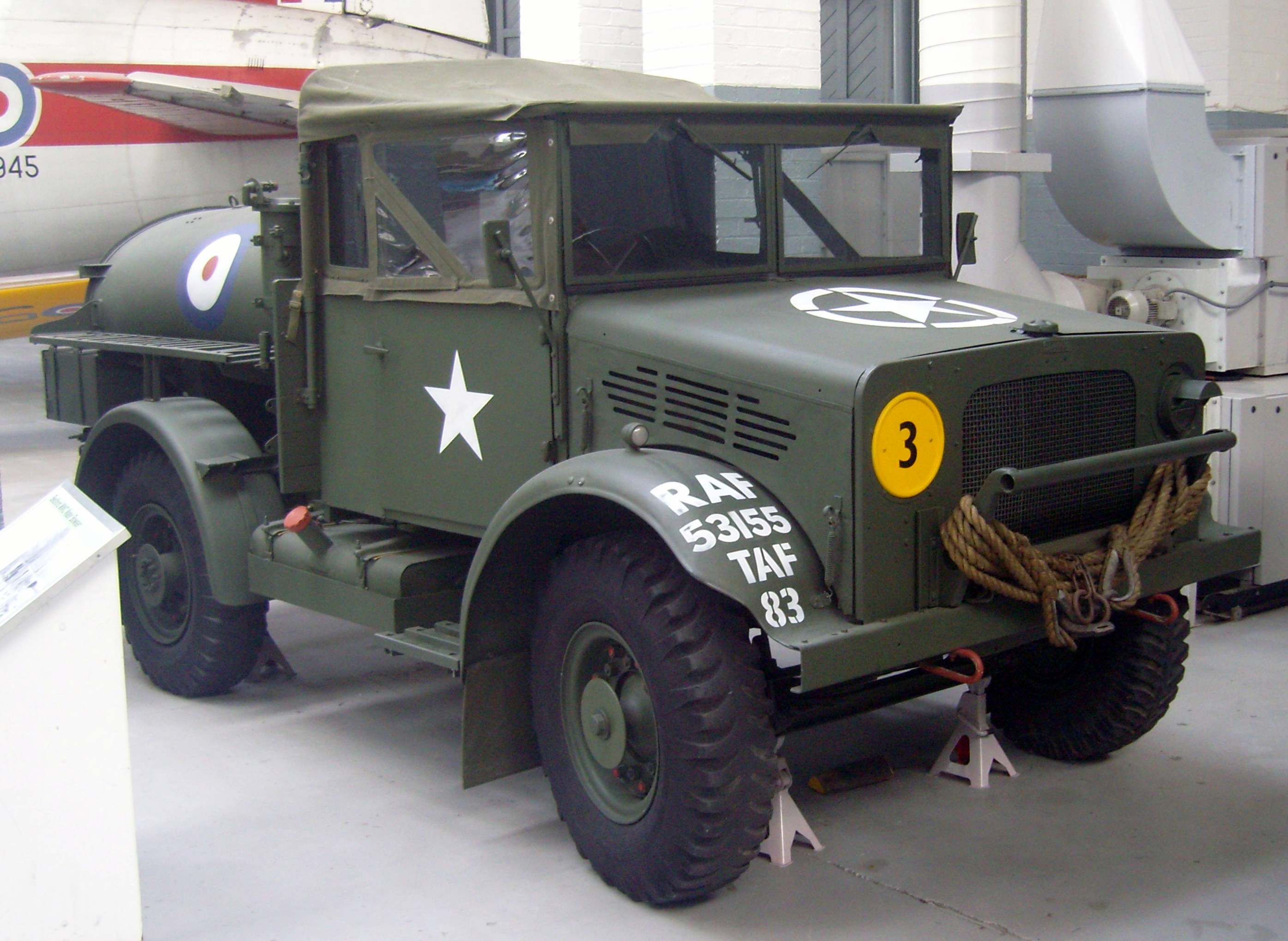
Bedford MWC water tank

The Bedford MW was a 15 cwt (760 kg) load capacity 4×2 truck, powered by a Bedford 72 bhp (54 kW) six-cylinder inline 210 cu in (3.5 L) petrol engine through a four speed transmission.

Despite lacking four wheel drive and so being unsuited for off-road use, the MW's powerful engine, short wheel base, low centre of gravity and relatively light weight gave it excellent acceleration and "almost sports car like handling".

The early MWs were open cabbed with individual folding windscreens ("aeroscreens"), canvas doors and a collapsible canvas tilt. A full windscreen and steel doors were fitted on later vehicles but the cab remained open. From 1943 an enclosed cab with doors and perspex side screens was added, retaining the canvas top. The vehicle had a distinctive wide bonnet, necessitated by the need to accommodate a special extra large WD air filter that was never fitted to production vehicles.

== History ==
In 1935 the War Office issued specifications for a new 15 cwt 4x2 military truck for service with the British Army, inviting manufacturers to submit designs to take part in annual comparative trials in North Wales, one entrant was a modification of a Bedford 2-ton rear wheel drive lorry.

Following these trials Bedford fitted a larger radiator and larger tyres, the trials were repeated in 1936 after which Bedford modified the chassis to increase ground clearance and installed a new engine cooling system. For the 1937 trials a new special Bedford WD-1 prototype was produced with a 15 cwt payload, it performed admirably and in 1938 the eventual 72 bhp (54 kW) engine was installed.

Between 1939 and 1945 Bedford produced 65,995 MWs, the vehicles remained in British service until the late 1950s.

== Use ==
The MW was intended mainly to be a workhorse for the British Army's infantry battalions, but throughout the war it was adapted to a number of roles and was eventually also used by the Royal Air Force, Royal Navy, other government departments and some overseas customers.

=== Variants ===
The Bedford MW was built in multiple variants including:

- Bedford MWD cargo truck with General Service body approx 6 by 6 ft (1.8 by 1.8 m). Main transport of an infantry battalion.
- Bedford MWC water tank truck
- Bedford MWT anti-aircraft gun tractor
- Bedford MWG QF 2-pounder anti-tank gun or 20mm Oerlikon portee
- Bedford MWR radio truck
- Bedford MWV Royal Air Force signals van
