= 135th Brigade =

135th Brigade may refer to:

- 135th (2/1st South Western) Brigade, United Kingdom
- 135th Field Artillery Brigade, United States

== See also ==
- 135th Regiment (disambiguation)
