= Albion CX22S =

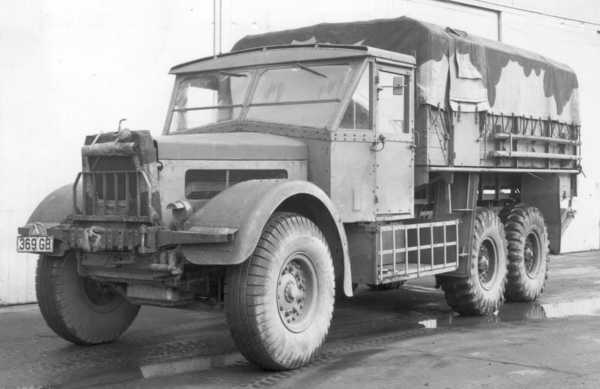
- Albion CX22S heavy artillery tractor
- Type: Heavy artillery tractor
- Place of origin: United Kingdom

Service history
- In service: 1943–1945
- Used by: British Army
- Wars: World War II

Production history
- Designer: Albion Motors
- Designed: 1943
- Manufacturer: Albion Motors
- Produced: November 1943 to June 1945
- No. built: 532

Specifications
- Mass: 10.45 long tons (10.62 t)
- Length: 25 ft 6 in (7.77 m)
- Width: 8 ft 9 in (2.67 m)
- Height: 10 ft 4 in (3.15 m)
- Engine: Six-cylinder inline Albion EN244 diesel 100 bhp (75 kW) at 1,750rpm
- Payload capacity: 5.13 long tons (5.21 t)
- Drive: 6x4
- Transmission: 4F1Rx2
- Suspension: Live axles on semi-elliptical multi leaf springs
- Maximum speed: 28 mph (45 km/h)
- References: Imperial War Museum & Pat Ware

The Albion CX22S was a heavy artillery tractor used by the British Army during World War II.

== Overview ==
The Albion CX22S was designed and built by Albion Motors in late 1943 to supplement the Scammell Pioneer heavy artillery tractor, which was not available in sufficient numbers. In service the CX22S was used by the British Army to tow the 155mm Long Tom and the BL 7.2-inch howitzer.

The CX22S was based on Albion's CX23N 10-ton truck. The CX22S was a wheeled 6x4 truck, powered by a 100 bhp (75 kW) six-cylinder inline diesel engine, through a four-speed gearbox and two-speed auxiliary gearbox. The cab of the CX22S had bench seating for two or three whilst the rear body had bench seating for four and folding seats for two more along with stowage for tools, equipment and ammunition. The CX22S was fitted with an 8 long tons (8.1 t) Scammell vertical-spindle winch under the rear body to assist with moving a gun.

Albion built 532 CX22S artillery tractors between November 1943 and June 1945.

== See also ==
- M4 tractor
- Mack NO
