= 128th =

128th may refer to:

- Hundred twenty-eighth note, in music

== Geography ==
- 128th meridian east, a line of longitude 128° east of Greenwich
- 128th meridian west, a line of longitude 128° west of Greenwich

== Military ==
- 128th (Moose Jaw) Battalion, CEF, a unit in the Canadian Expeditionary Force during the First World War
- 128th Air Refueling Wing, an Air Mobility Command unit of the Wisconsin Air National Guard
- 128th Airborne Command and Control Squadron, a unit of the Georgia Air National Guard that flies the E-8C Joint STARS
- 128th Illinois Volunteer Infantry Regiment, an infantry regiment that served in the Union Army during the American Civil War
- 128th Infantry Brigade (United Kingdom), a 1st Line Territorial Army brigade of the British Army during the Second World War
- 128th Infantry Regiment (United States), a United States military unit of the Wisconsin National Guard
- 128th Mountain Assault Brigade (Ukraine), a formation of the Ukrainian Ground Forces
- 128th New York Volunteer Infantry, a volunteer regiment from upstate New York during the American Civil War
- 128th Pioneers, an infantry regiment of the British Indian Army
- 128th Regiment of Foot, an infantry regiment of the British Army, created in 1794 and disbanded in 1796

== Politics ==
- 128th Delaware General Assembly, a meeting of the Delaware Senate and the Delaware House of Representatives
- Ohio 128th General Assembly, the legislative body of the state of Ohio for the years 2009 and 2010

== See also ==
- 128 (number)
- AD 128, the year 128 (CXXVIII) of the Julian calendar
- 128 BC
