= 128th Division =

128th Division may refer to:

- 128th Division (People's Republic of China)
- 128th Division (Imperial Japanese Army)
- 128th Guards Mechanized Division, Ukraine, previously the 128th Guards Motor Rifle Division of the Soviet Union
- 128th Machine-Gun Artillery Division, Russia/Soviet Union
- 128th Rifle Division, Soviet Union

== See also ==
- List of military divisions by number
- 128th Brigade (disambiguation)
- 128th Regiment (disambiguation)
- 128th (disambiguation)
