= 135th Field Artillery Brigade =

135th Field Artillery
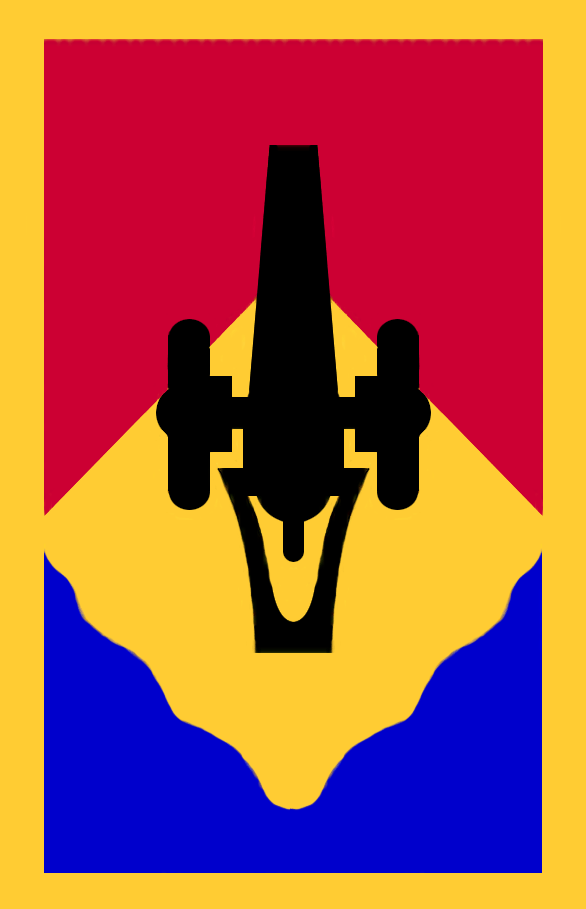
- Active: 1917-2008
- Country: United States
- Allegiance: Missouri
- Branch: Army National Guard
- Type: Field Artillery
- Size: Brigade
- Garrison/HQ: Sedalia, Missouri
- Engagements: World War I Meuse-Argonne; Alsace Lorraine

Insignia
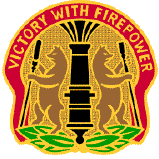
- 135th Field Artillery Brigade DUI

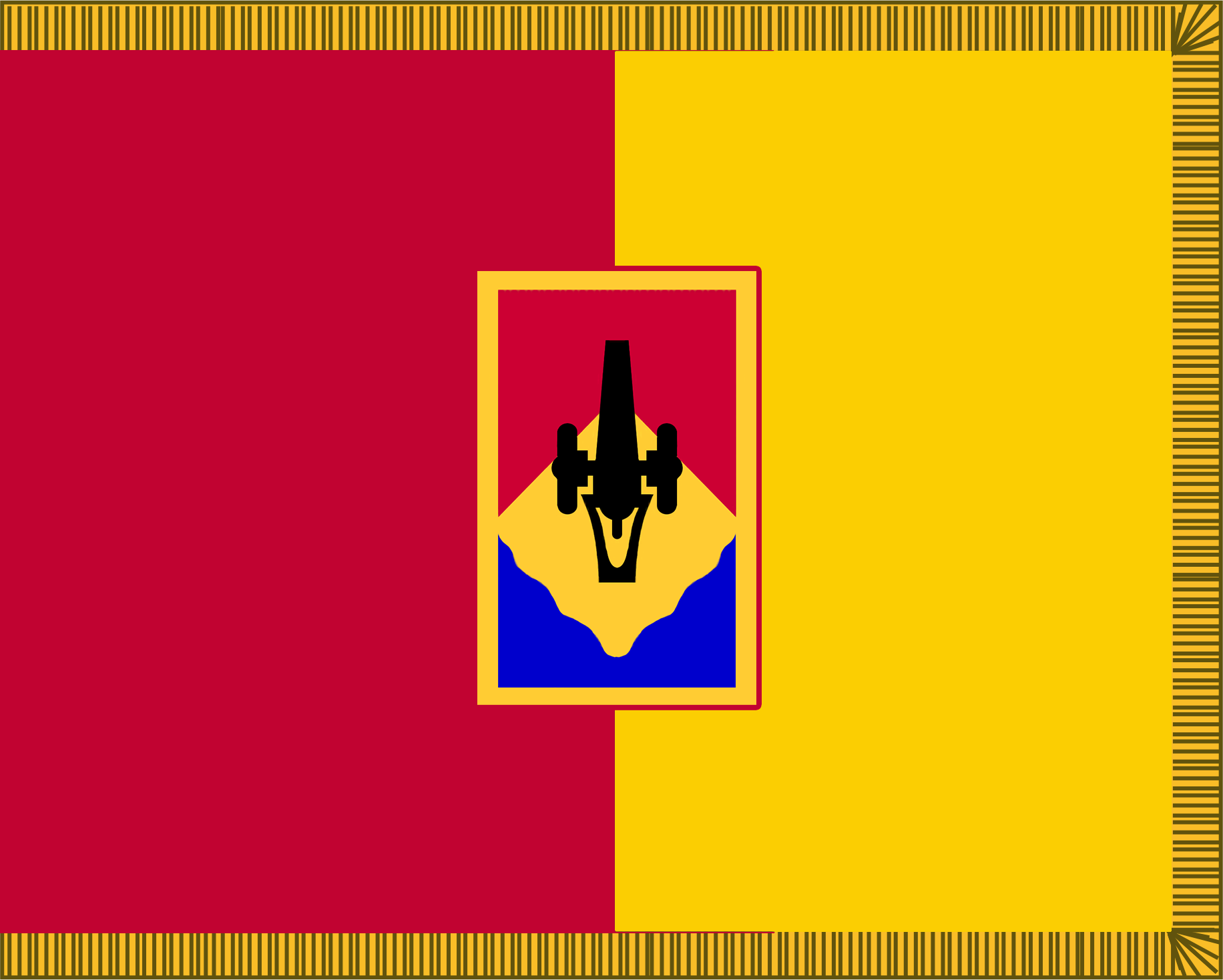
- 135th Field Artillery Brigade Flag

The 135th Field Artillery Brigade was a unit of the Missouri National Guard. The unit had a long lineage that began in May 1917 as the 5th Separate Company of Infantry from Sedalia, Missouri. The unit was redesignated as D Company, 6th Infantry Regiment and entered into federal service in August 1917. Reorganized as D Company, 140th Infantry Regiment, 35th Infantry Division in May 1919 at Ft. Riley, Kansas. The unit participated in the Meuse-Argonne, Alsace, and Lorraine campaigns of World War I.

In 1920, the unit would finally become an artillery unit - D Battery, 1st Battalion Field Artillery. In 1921, it would be moved to the 128th Field Artillery. In 1926, the unit was reorganized as Headquarters Battery, 2nd Battalion, 128th Field Artillery. The unit would be federalized in November 1940 and inactivated in 1942. It would be redesignated in 1948 as C Battery, 128th Field Artillery of the 35th Infantry Division. In 1959, it was again reorganized as Headquarters Battery, 2nd Howitzer Battalion, 128th Artillery of the 35th Infantry Division.

In 1963, reorganized again as Headquarters Battery, 135th Artillery Group and finally in 1978 as Headquarters Battery of the 135th Artillery Brigade. The Brigade was deactivated in 2008.
