= 60 Medium Regiment (India) =

- Active: 1957 – present
- Country: India
- Allegiance: India
- Branch: Indian Army
- Type: Artillery
- Size: Regiment
- Motto(s): Sarvatra, Izzat-O-Iqbal (Everywhere with Honour and Glory); Har Kadam Aage
- Colors: Red & Navy Blue
- Anniversaries: 1 January – Raising Day

Insignia
- Abbreviation: 60 Med Regt

60 Medium Regiment is part of the Regiment of Artillery of the Indian Army.

== Formation ==
The regiment traces its history from 1823, when the Jammu and Kashmir Bodyguard Cavalry was raised by Maharaja Gulab Singh, the founder of Dogra dynasty and the first Maharaja of the princely state of Jammu and Kashmir. It was composed of Hindu Dogra troops. As part of the Imperial Service Troops, the unit fought in World War I. The regiment gave a brilliant account of itself in the Palestine campaign and in recognition of its achievements, it was awarded the battle honours Megiddo, Sharon and Palestine.

The regiment as part of Jammu and Kashmir State Forces saw action during the Indo-Pakistani war of 1947–1948. The regiment was disbanded in 1956 and all the personnel, except officers were absorbed into the newly raised artillery regiment on 1 January 1957. This unit was designated as 60 Heavy Regiment. At raising, the unit was equipped with Mark 6 BL 7.2-inch Howitzers. The first commanding officer was Lieutenant Colonel KL Suri VrC. The regiment was unique in its composition of four batteries with four howitzers in each battery, unlike the standard three-battery (with six guns each) composition of other Indian artillery regiments. These batteries were designated 128, 129, 130 and 131 heavy batteries. The unit received its initial training at Tirumalagiri in Secunderabad. The regiment was converted to a field regiment in August 1991 after its guns were transferred to 61 Heavy Regiment. It shed its 131 Heavy Battery to 106 Medium Regiment. The regiment is presently a medium regiment with 128, 129 and 130 medium batteries, the same configuration as all other artillery regiments.

== Operations ==
The regiment has taken part in the following operations –

- Indo-Pakistani war of 1965 – The unit took part in Operation Ablaze and Operation Riddle and was deployed in the Amritsar sector. It was part of 21 Independent Artillery Brigade under 15 Infantry Division, where it was in support of an infantry brigade. The regiment played an important role in the capture of Dograi and destroyed most of the Pakistani bridges built on the Ichogil Canal.
- Indo-Pakistani war of 1971 – The regiment was deployed in Firozpur sector during Operation Cactus Lily. It was part of 7 Artillery Brigade under 7 Infantry Division. Two batteries each were deployed in Khalra sub-sector under 65 Infantry Brigade and Khem Karan subsector under 48 Infantry Brigade. The unit saw action in Baltoha and Asal Uttar.
- Operation Rakshak – 60 Field Regiment was deployed in counter terrorist operations in Jammu and Kashmir between April 1997 and July 2000. It was also involved in firing across the Line of Control (LoC). In July 2003, the unit moved to the Batalik sector.
- Operation Vijay – The regiment was deployed in Uri under an infantry brigade and in Batalik under a mountain brigade during the operations.

== Equipment ==
The regiment has used the following guns-

- BL 7.2-inch howitzers
- 122 mm howitzer
- Indian Field Gun
- Light field gun

== Gallantry awards ==
The regiment has won the following gallantry awards -

- During Operation Rakshak, the unit was awarded the General Officer Commanding, 14 Corps appreciation letter.
- The unit was awarded the General Officer Commanding-in-Chief, South Western Command Unit Citation in 2018.
- The unit was awarded the General Officer Commanding-in-Chief, Northern Command Unit Citation in 2022.
- Sena Medal – Captain Ajay Singh Rana (posthumous) and Lance Naik (Operator) Susheel Kumar (both for Operation Rakshak)
- Vishisht Seva Medal – Colonel Ravinder Ahuja (for Operation Vijay)
- Chief of Army Staff Commendation cards – 10 (Second Lieutenant Harsharanjit Singh, Subedar Sarisht Singh and Lance Naik Choote Lal (1965 operations))
- Vice Chief of Army Staff Commendation Cards - 2
- General Officer Commanding in Chief Commendation cards – 35

== Motto ==
The motto of the regiment is हर कदम आगे (Har Kadam Aage) which translates to Every Step Forward.

== See also ==
- List of artillery regiments of Indian Army
