= Scammell Pioneer =

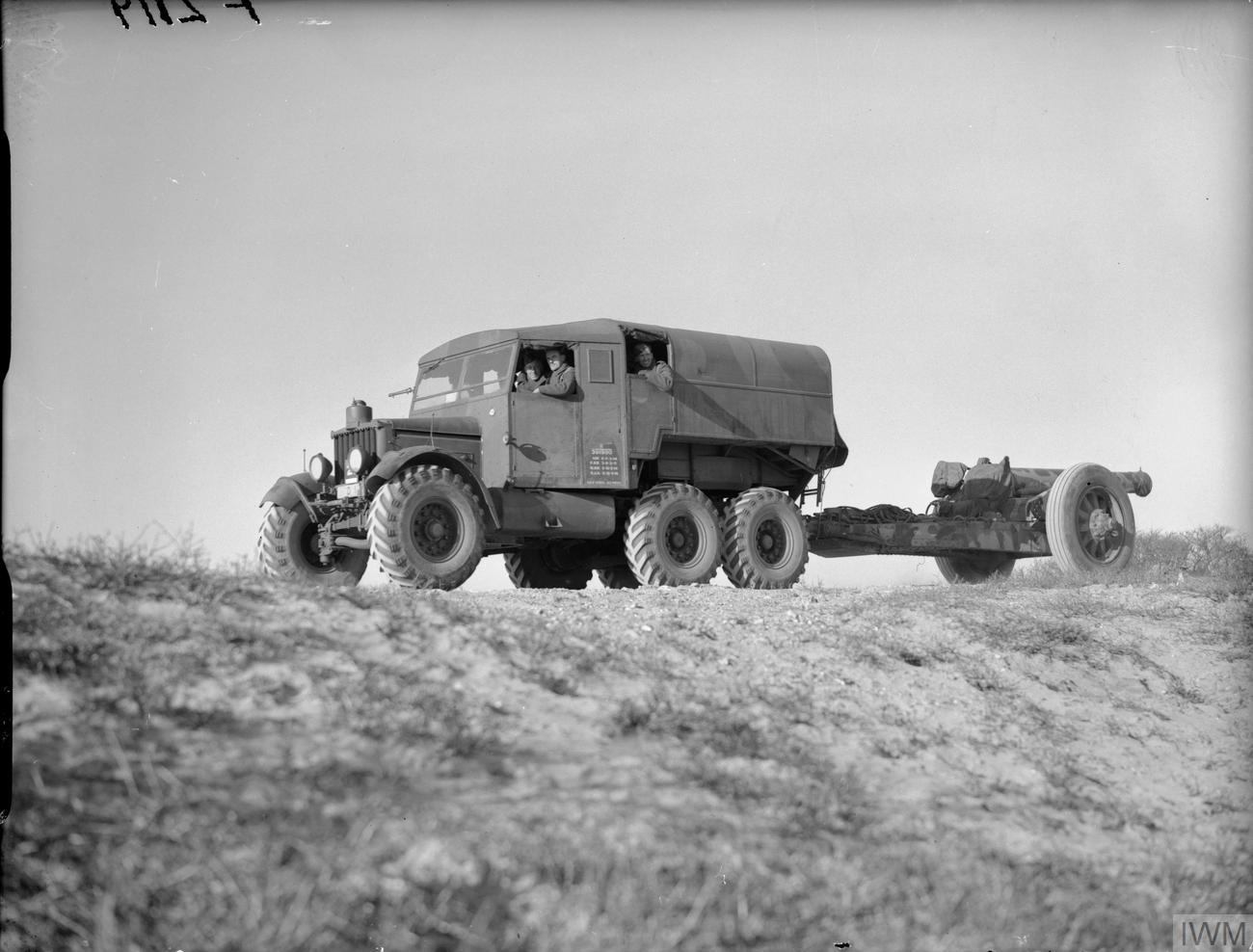
- A British Army Scammell Pioneer towing an 8-inch howitzer of 1st Heavy Regiment, near Calais (12 January 1940)
- Type: Tractor unit
- Place of origin: United Kingdom

Service history
- In service: 1932 - 1980s
- Used by: British Army
- Wars: World War II

Production history
- Designer: Scammell
- Designed: 1927
- Produced: 1927–1945
- No. built: 3,414
- Variants: Heavy artillery tractor, heavy recovery vehicle & tank transporter

Specifications
- Mass: Unladen: 8.38 long tons (8.51 t); Payload: 2.95 long tons (3.00 t); Max towed: 19.64 long tons (19.96 t)
- Length: 20 feet 7 inches (6.27 m); Tank transporter: 22 feet (6.7 m), with trailer: 36 feet 6 inches (11.13 m)
- Width: 8 feet 6 inches (2.59 m); Tank transporter: 9 feet 5 inches (2.87 m)
- Height: 9 feet 9 inches (2.97 m)
- Engine: 510 cu in (8.4 L) Gardner 6-cylinder Diesel; 102 brake horsepower (76 kW) at 1700 rpm
- Drive: 6x4
- Transmission: 6-speed constant-mesh gearbox
- Suspension: Walking beam
- Operational range: 430 miles (690 km)
- Maximum speed: 24 miles per hour (39 km/h)

The Scammell Pioneer was a British 6×4 tractor unit used in World War II as an artillery tractor, recovery vehicle and tank transporter.

== Development ==
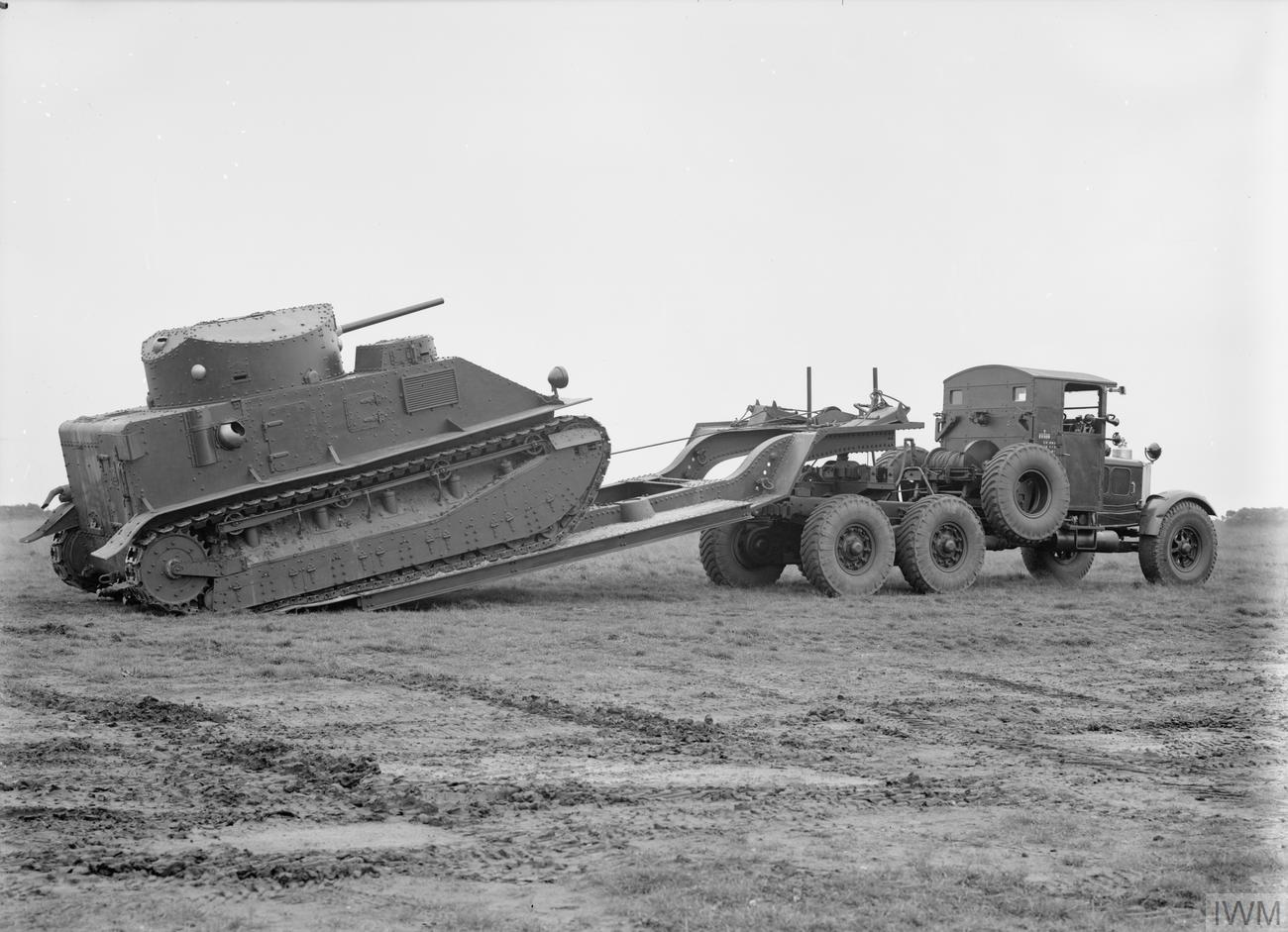
The prototype tank transporter of 1929, H 22509, loading a Medium Mark II

Designed as a 6×4 off-road vehicle for use in Britain's colonies where metalled (sealed) roads were scarce, the Pioneer was first produced in 1927. Though lacking all-wheel drive, its combination of a suspension with great travel, excellent traction, and a low-revving engine gave it impressive pulling power on rough ground at low speeds.

Though not designed for military use, the British War Office purchased a single petrol engined example in 1932. Equipped as a tank transporter with a permanently coupled 18 t semi-trailer, it was assigned to a training unit but did not initially catch on. Additional transporters were not purchased until 1937.

== Military use ==
With the exception of the single 1932 tank transporter, all Pioneers purchased by the British Army were equipped with a 102 bhp (76 kW) Gardner 6-cylinder diesel engine, driving the rear wheels through a constant-mesh gearbox and fitted with a power take-off driving a Scammell winch.

=== Artillery tractor ===
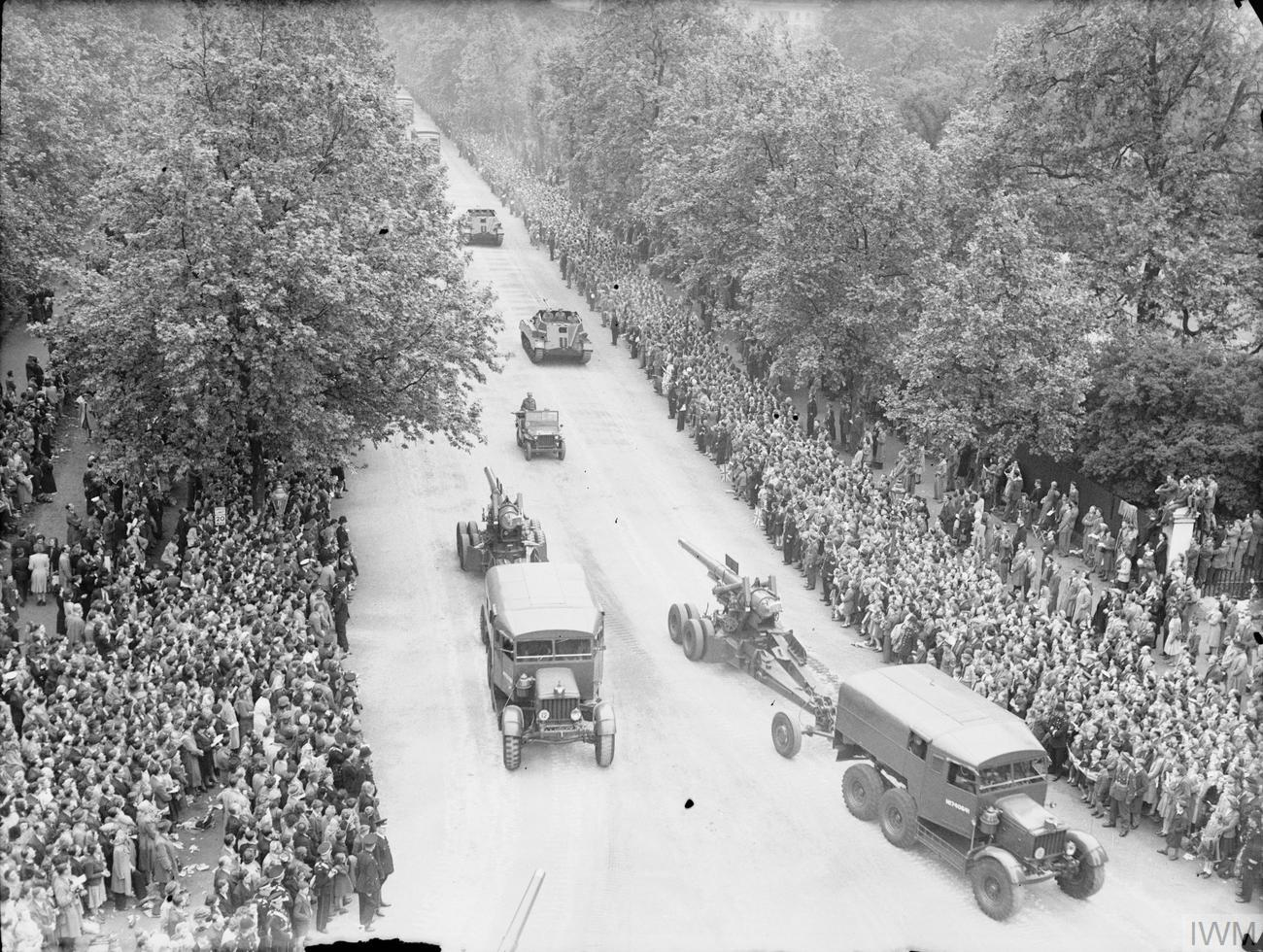
Pioneer artillery tractors in the London Victory Parade, June 1946

Introduced in 1935, the Pioneer R100 heavy artillery tractor was used throughout World War II to tow medium and heavy artillery pieces. It had accommodation for the gun's crew, tools, equipment, and ammunition.

Typical early war use included towing such medium pieces as the 60-pounder, 6-inch howitzer, 4.5-inch gun and 5.5-inch howitzer, until the AEC Matador medium gun tractor was issued in sufficient numbers. Heavy artillery pieces towed included the 6-inch gun, 8-inch howitzer, 155 mm Long Tom and the 7.2-inch howitzer.

Many Pioneer gun tractors were lost in France in June 1940 with the evacuation of the British Expeditionary Force (BEF), either destroyed by the withdrawing troops or captured by the Germans.

Scammell produced 980 Pioneer R100 heavy artillery tractors by the end of the war. As this quantity was insufficient to meet requirements, the Pioneer was supplemented by the Albion CX22S heavy artillery tractor from late 1943.

=== Recovery vehicle ===
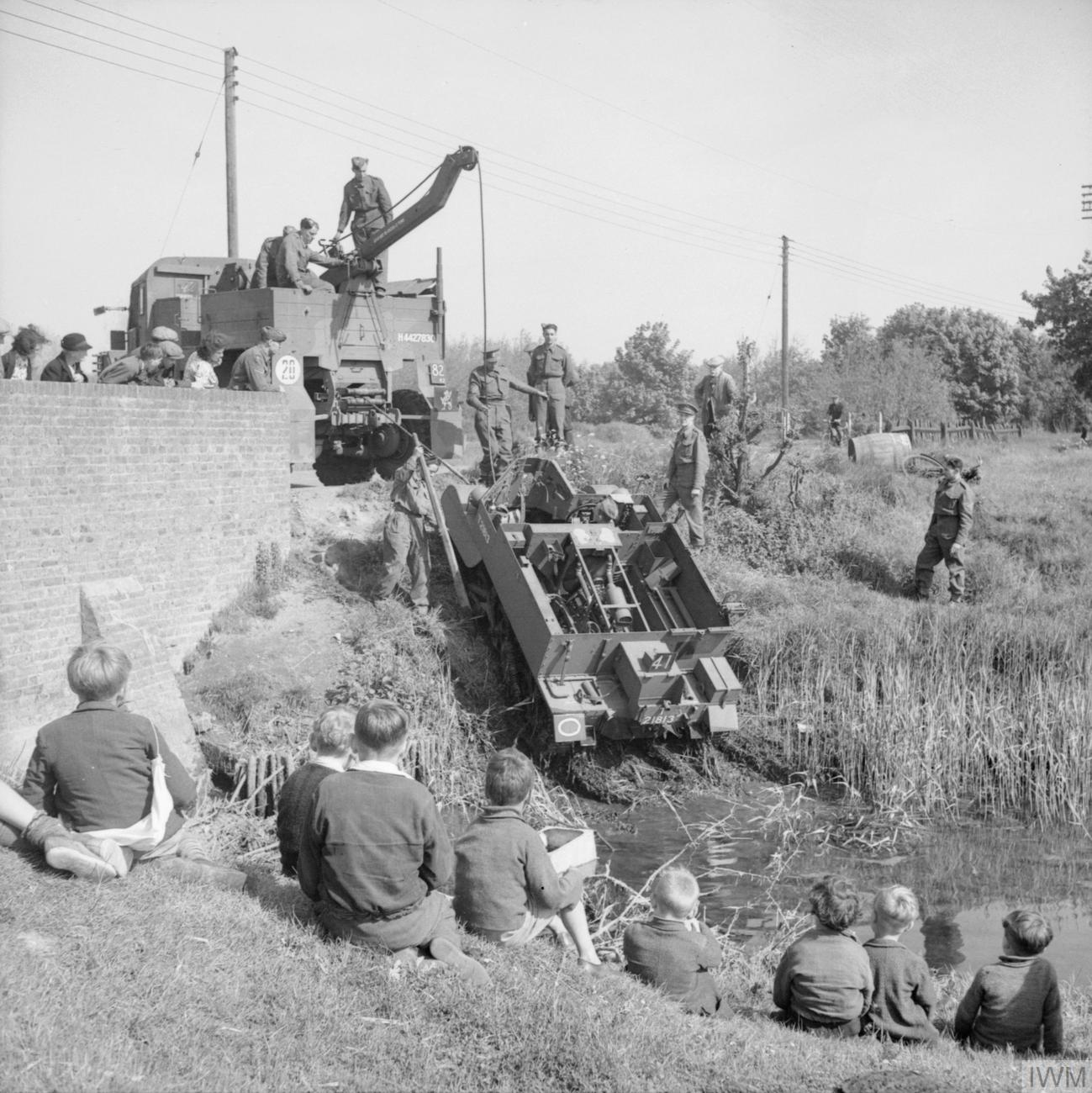
Pioneer recovering a Universal Carrier, Sussex 1941

From 1936, the British Army began to receive Pioneer heavy recovery vehicles. The first 43 delivered were designated the Pioneer SV1S and the Pioneer SV1T both with a 3-ton folding crane and lockers for recovery equipment and towing bars. Most of these early Pioneer recovery vehicles were lost with the BEF.

The Pioneer SV2S had a simpler redesigned extending crane that provided greater lifting height. It was Introduced in 1938 and remained in production throughout the war, with a total of 1,975 built by the end of the war.

Among the Pioneer's equipment was a pair of tracks that could be fitted over the two rear wheels, converting it temporarily into a half-track and giving greater traction on soft ground.

The last Pioneer recovery vehicle was not retired from the British Army until the 1980s in Belize.

=== Tank transporter ===
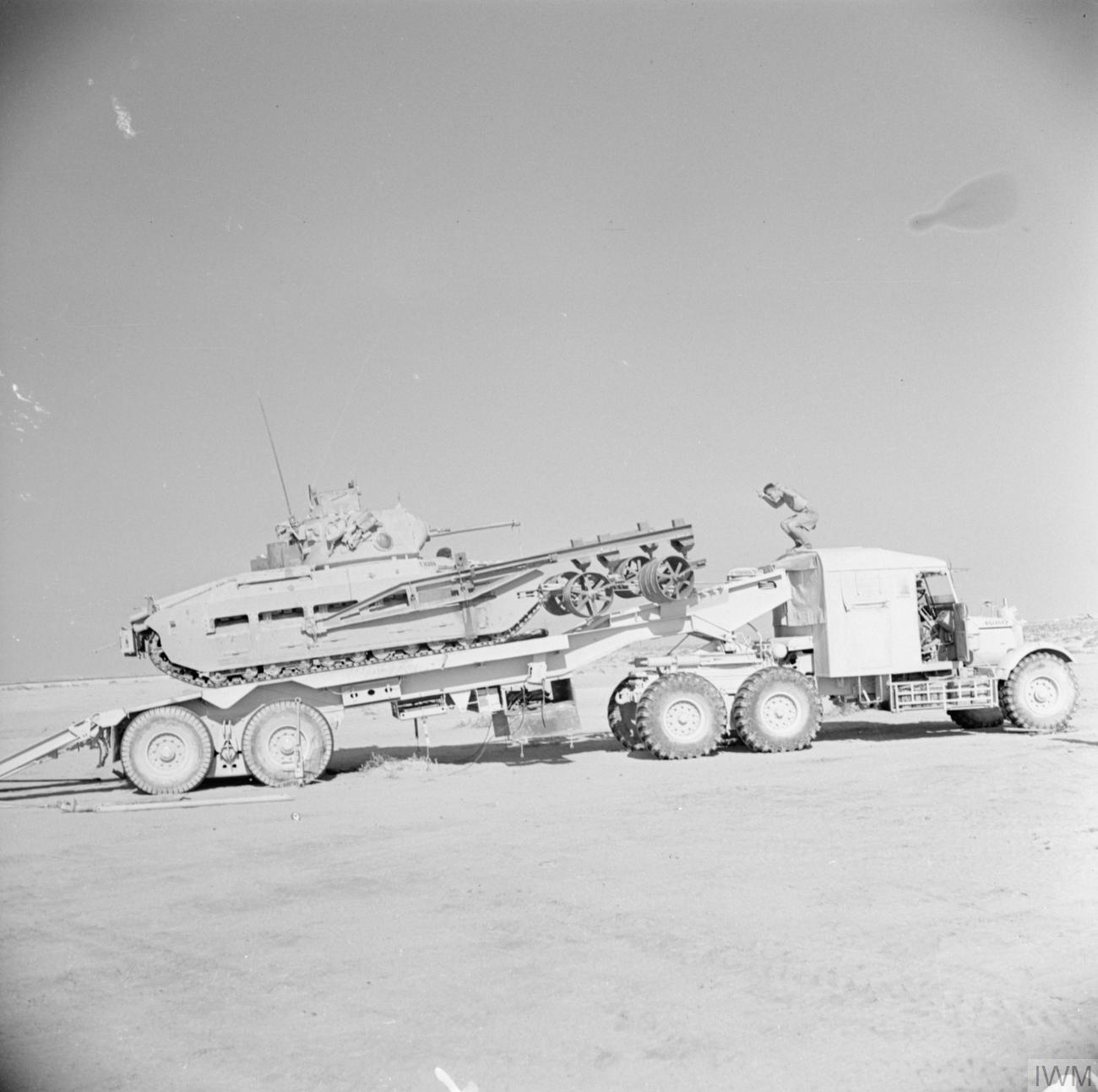
Matilda tank equipped with AMRA Mk 1a being loaded onto a Scammell transporter, August 1942.

Delivery of a production tank transporter did not begin until 1937. This was equipped with a longer wheelbase for an extended cab to accommodate the tank crew as passengers and larger rear wheels than the artillery tractor and recovery vehicle variants. It was designated Pioneer TRCU20.

20- and 30-ton (Pioneer TRMU30/TRCU30) tractor/trailer combinations were delivered. In both cases, the trailer was more-or-less fixed to the tractor, not demountable like modern semi-trailer trucks. Hinged ramps were used to get the tank onto the trailer; if the tank was immobilised, it could be pulled onto the trailer with the tractor unit's winch.

Pioneer tractor/trailer combinations proved too tall to carry higher profile US tanks under some British bridges, resulting in their being superseded by the American Diamond T tank transporter from 1941 on. Despite this, it remained in production throughout the war, with 459 being produced. As a result of their tall profile the trailers proved undesirable postwar and most were scrapped; the tractors were retained for use with other trailers or sold into civilian use.

== Gallery ==
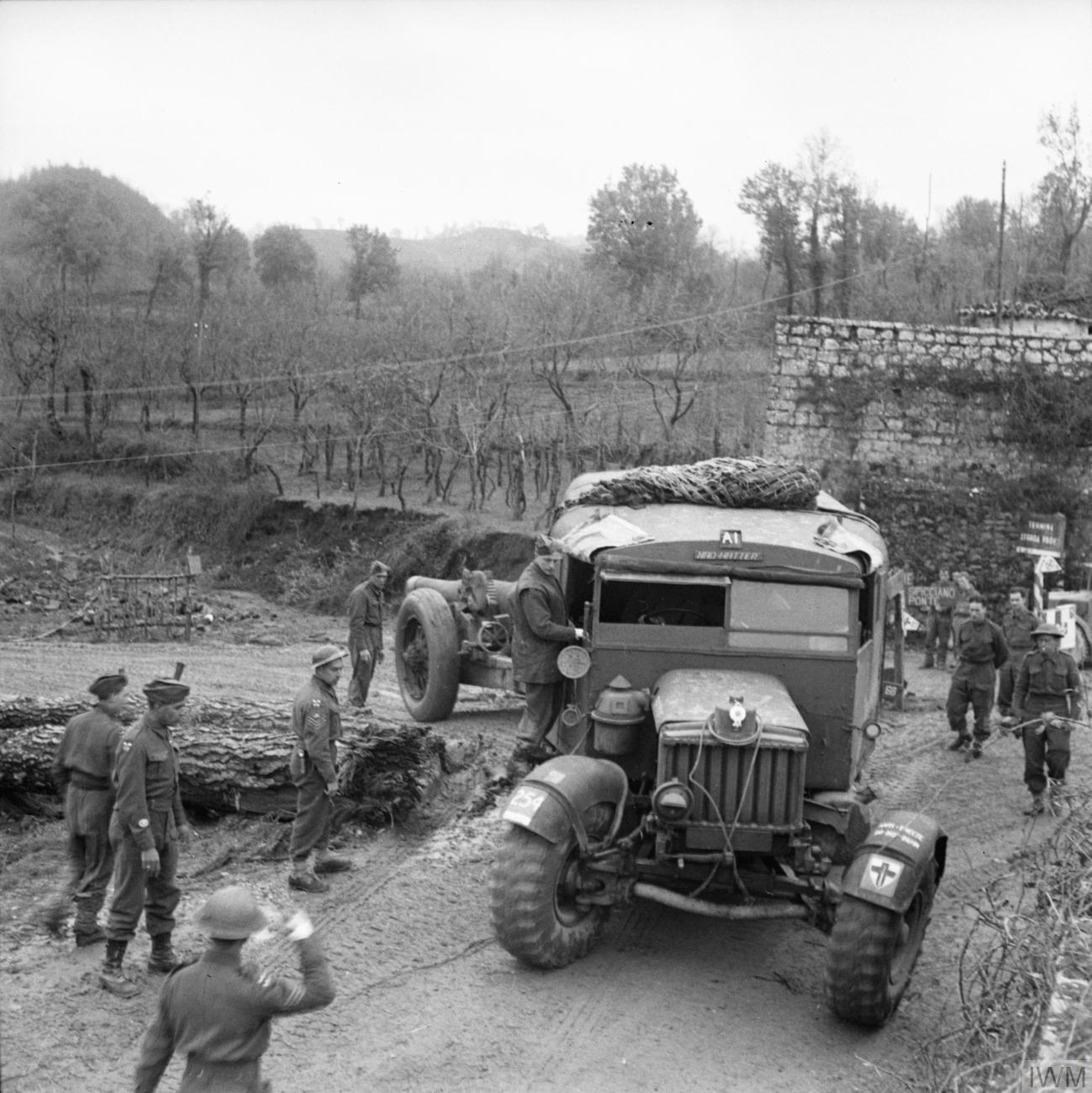
Scammell Pioneer artillery tractor, Italy 1943

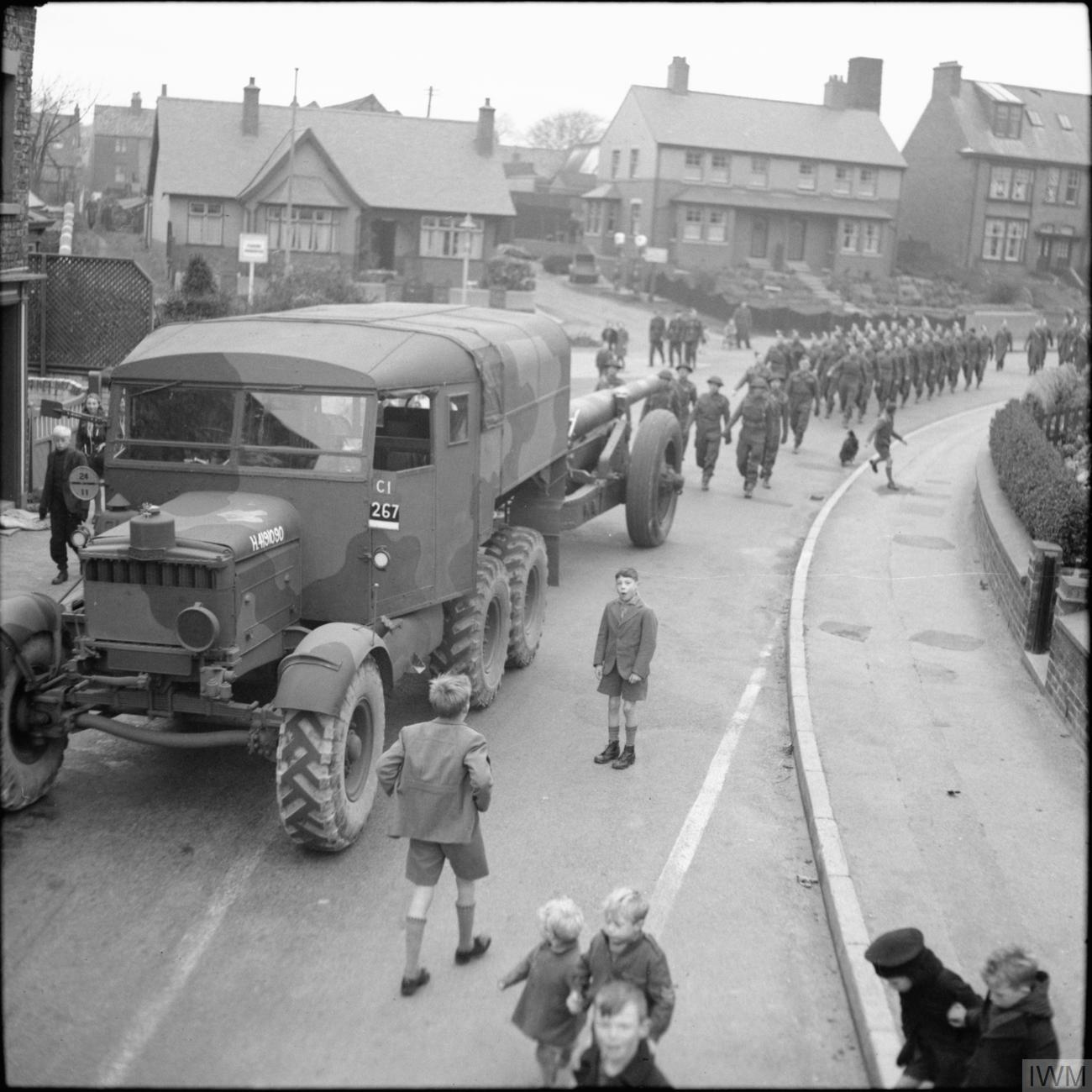
Scammell Pioneer artillery tractor, Yorkshire 1941

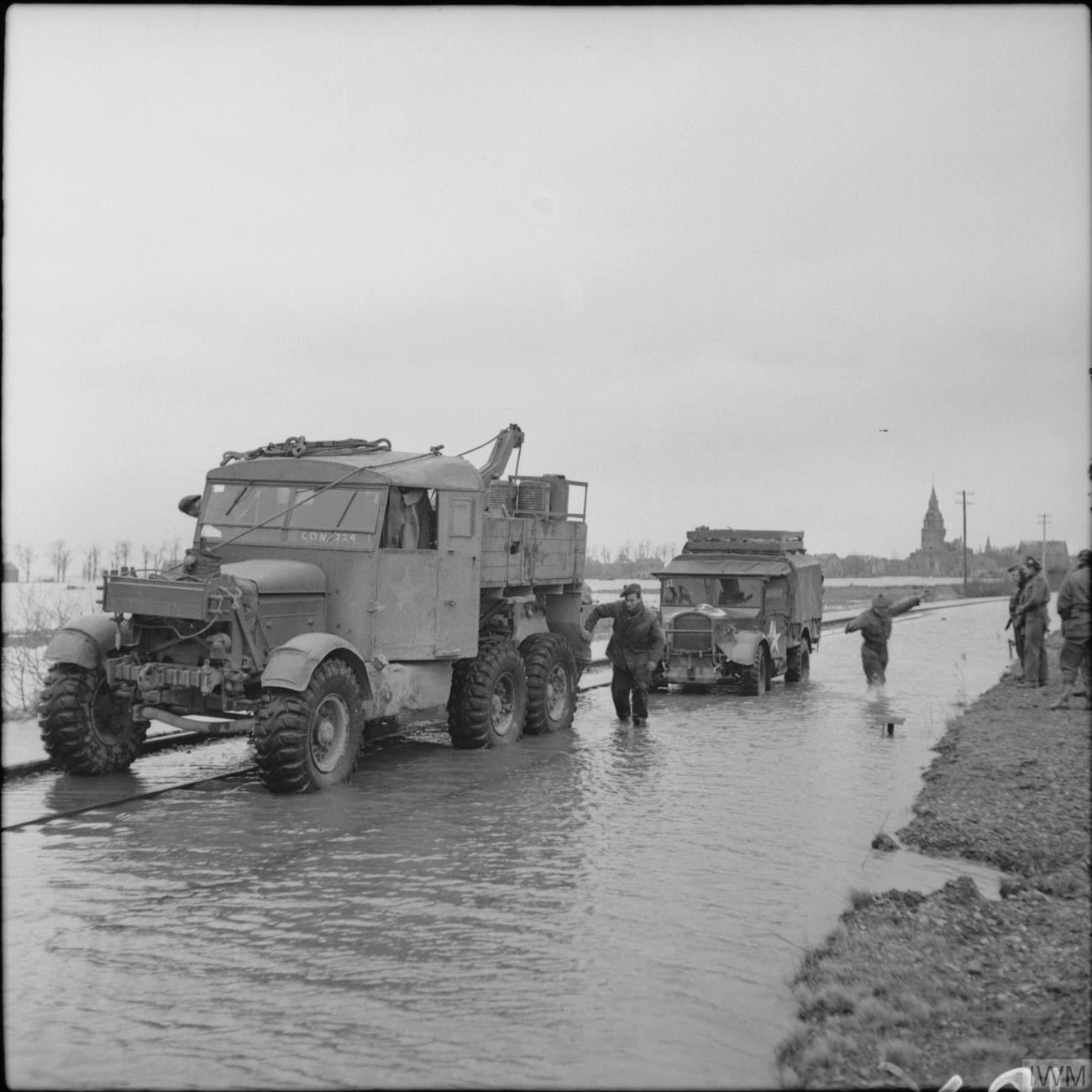
Scammell Pioneer recovery vehicle, 1945

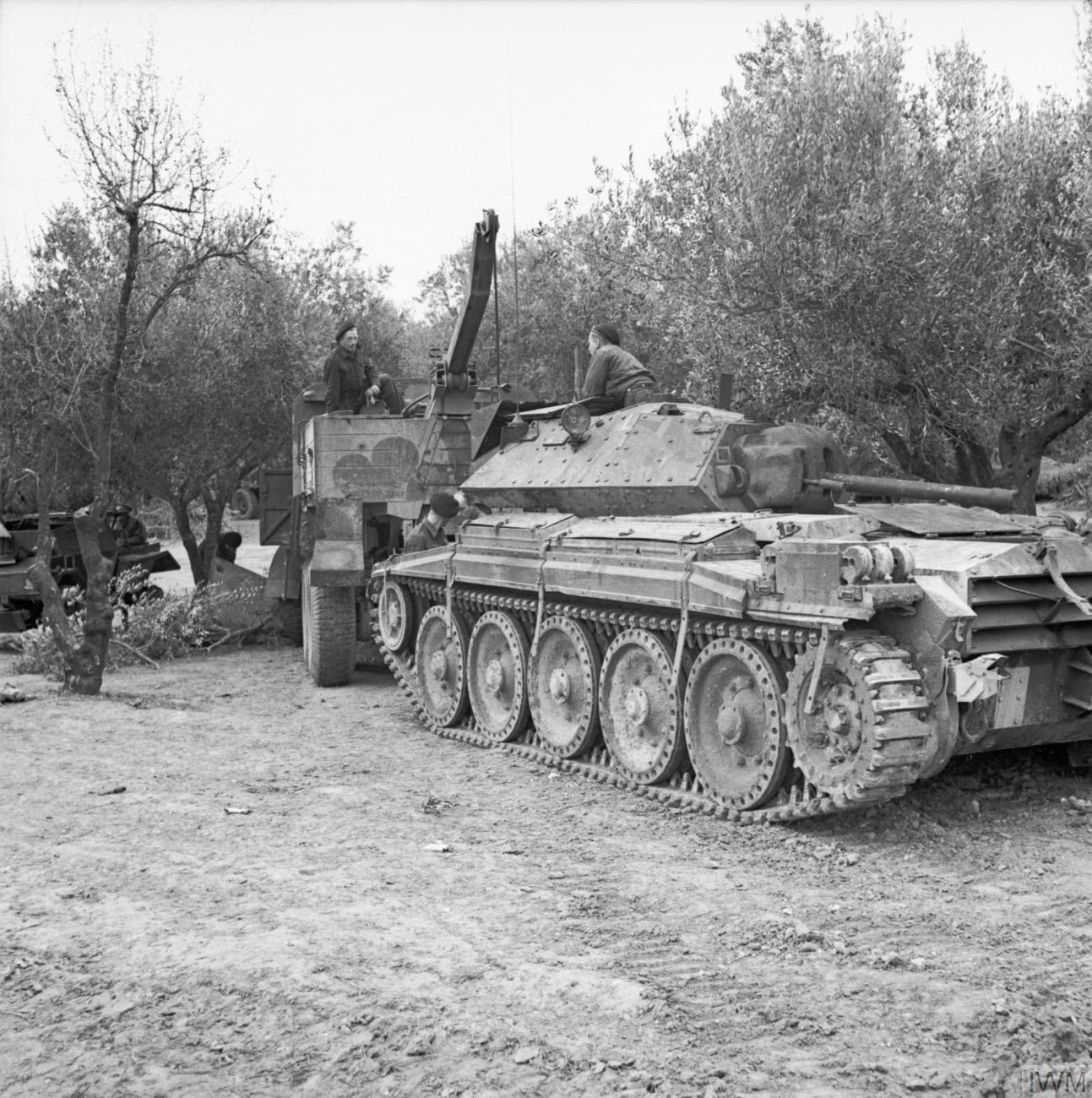
Scammell Pioneer recovery vehicle tows a Crusader tank, Tunisia 1943

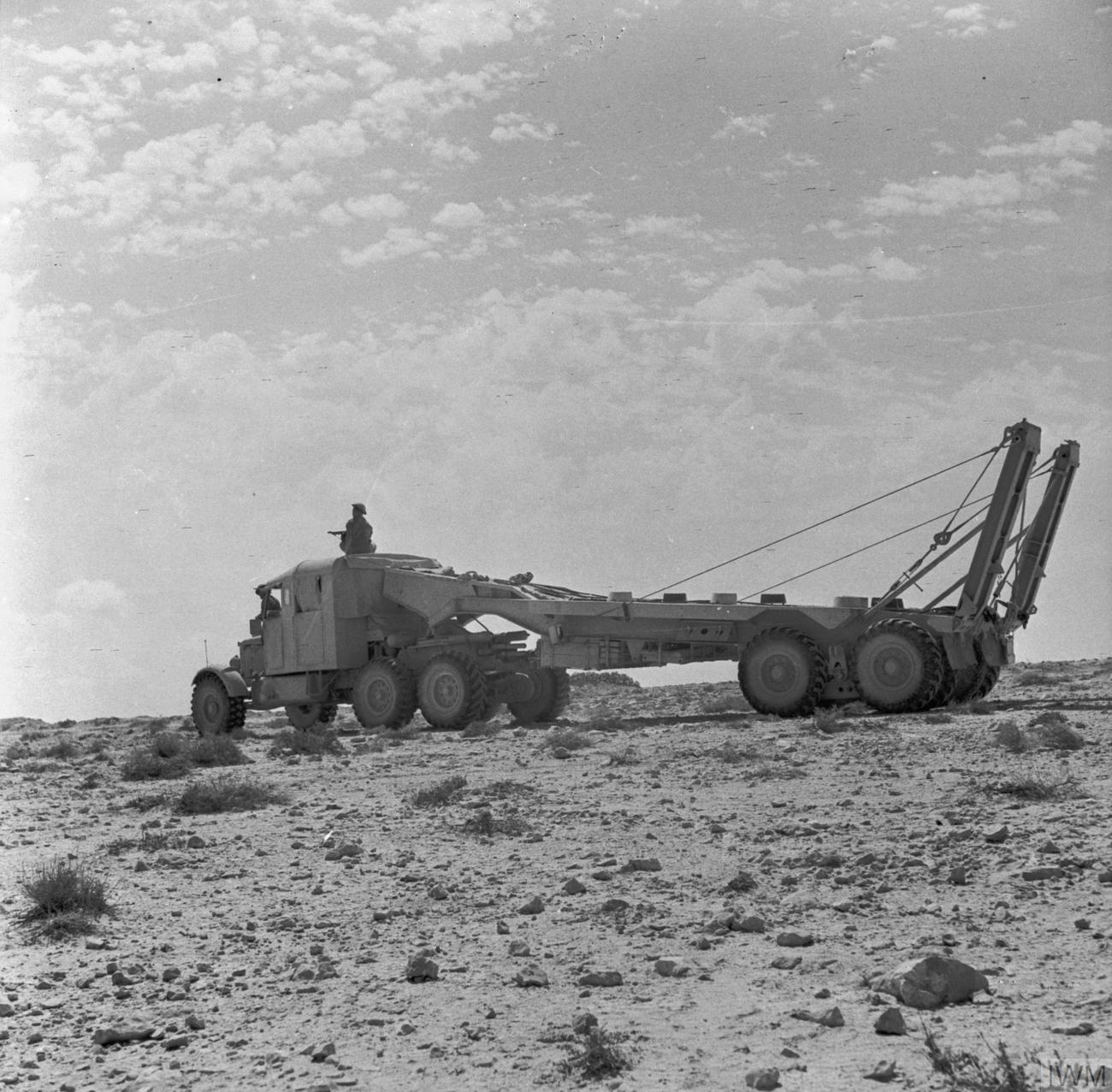
Scammell Pioneer Tank transporter, North Africa 1942

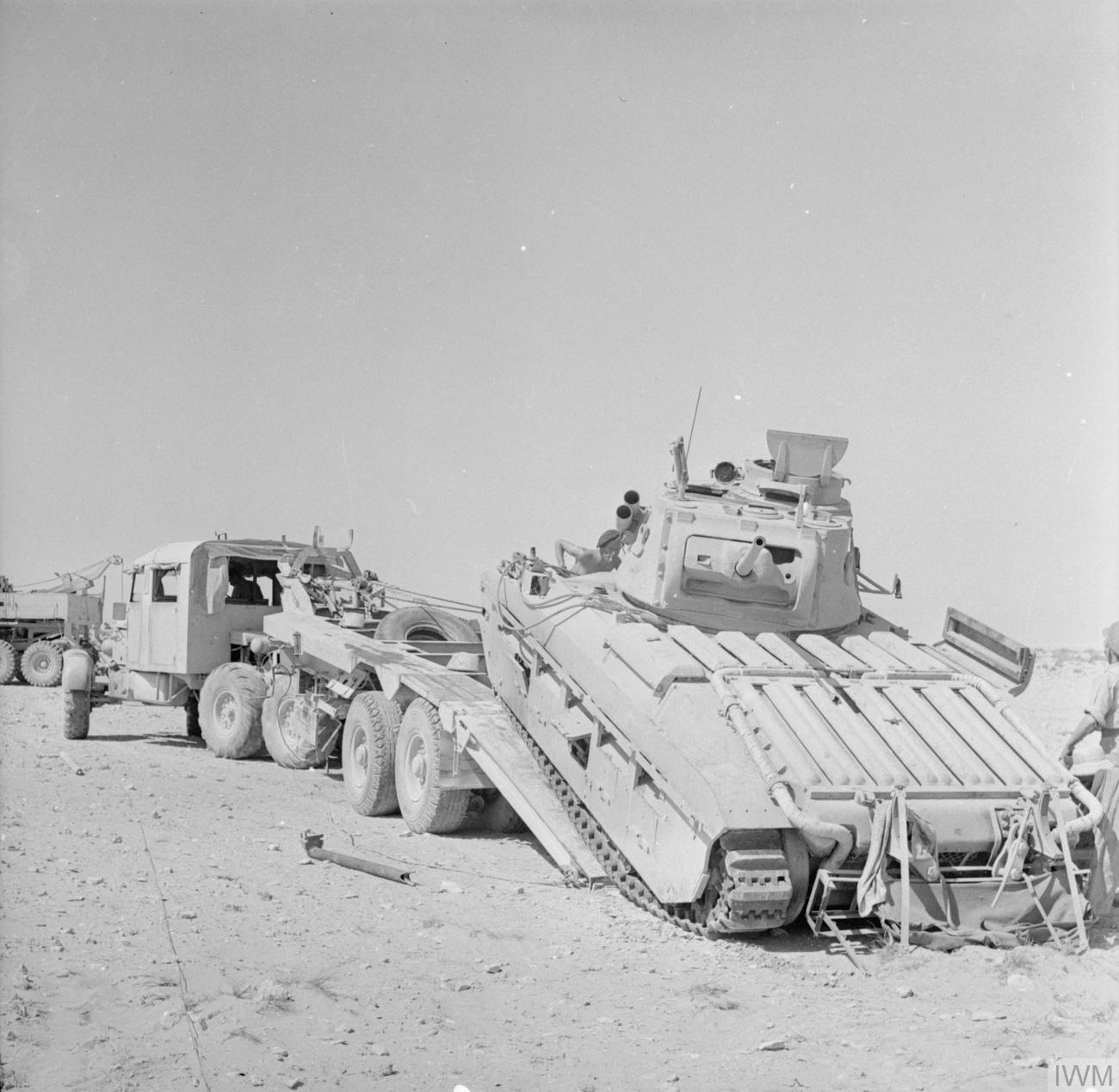
Scammell Pioneer Tank transporter recovers a Matilda II tank, North Africa 1942

== See also ==
- Mack NO 7½-ton 6x6 truck United States 6x6 heavy artillery tractor
