= BL 7.2-inch howitzer =

Heavy howitzer

BL 7.2-inch howitzer Mk I-IV
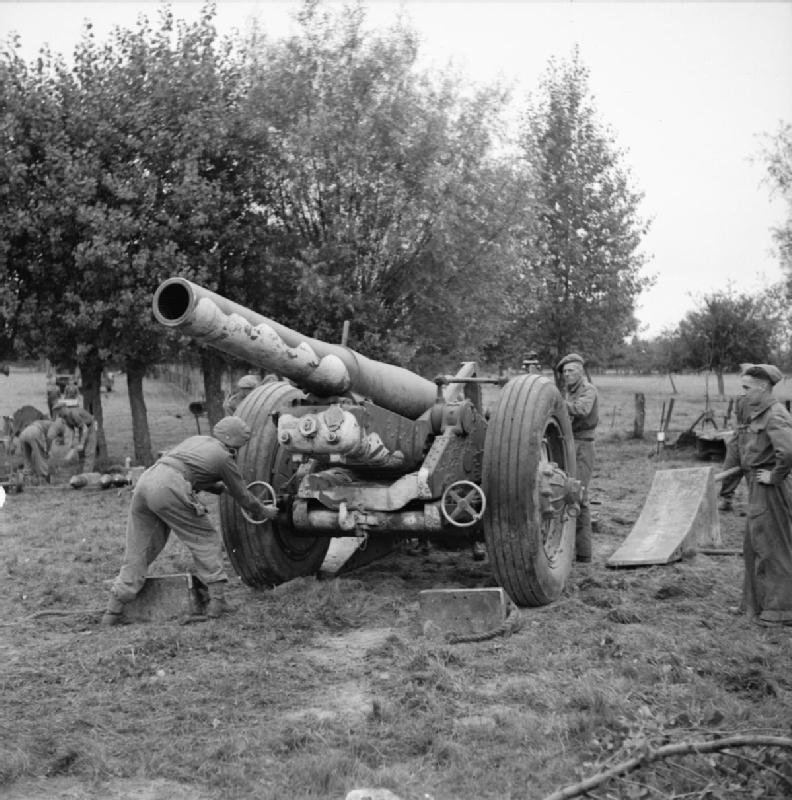
- 7.2-inch howitzer of 51st Heavy Regiment, Royal Artillery. France, September 1944.
- Type: Howitzer
- Place of origin: United Kingdom

Service history
- In service: 1940–1944
- Wars: Second World War

Production history
- Designed: 1940
- Produced: 1940–1944
- No. built: 78
- Variants: Mk I, Mk II, Mk III & Mk IV

Specifications
- Mass: 10.22 long tons (10.38 t)
- Length: 24 ft 4 in (7.42 m)
- Barrel length: 14 ft 3 in (4.34 m); L/22.4
- Width: 9 ft (2.7 m)
- Height: 4 ft 3 in (1.30 m)
- Crew: 10
- Shell: HE
- Shell weight: 200 pounds (90.7 kg)
- Calibre: 7.2 inches (182.9 mm)
- Breech: Welin screw & asbury mech
- Carriage: Box trail
- Elevation: 0° to 45°
- Traverse: 4° left & right
- Rate of fire: 3 rpm under optimal conditions
- Muzzle velocity: 1,697 ft/s (517 m/s)
- Maximum firing range: (Mk I-V) 16,900 yd (15,500 m); (Mk 6) 19,600 yd (17,900 m)
- References: Chris Bishop & Nigel Evans

BL 7.2-inch howitzer Mk 6
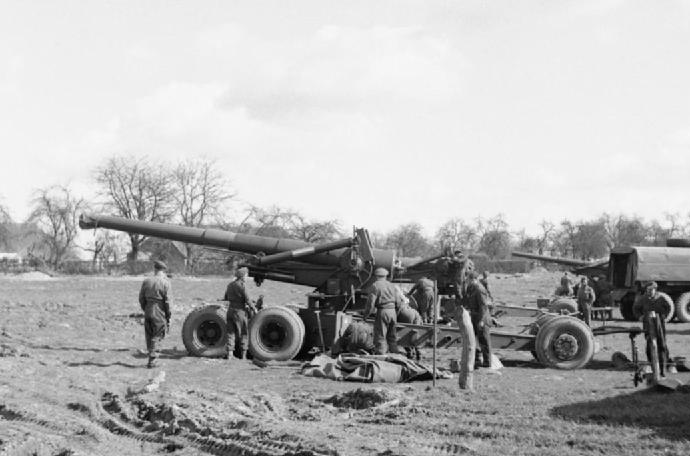
- 7.2 in howitzer Mk 6, on the US M1 carriage. Rhine crossing, 1945.

Service history
- In service: 1944–early 1960s
- Wars: Second World War

Production history
- Designed: 1944
- Produced: 1944–1945

Specifications
- Mass: Traveling 17.5 long tons (17.8 t) in action 13 long tons (13 t)
- Length: 34 ft (10 m)
- Barrel length: 20 ft 8 in (6.30 m); L/33.1
- Width: 8 ft (2.4 m)
- Height: 8 ft 3 in (2.51 m)
- Crew: 12
- Carriage: Split trail
- Elevation: -1° to 63°
- Traverse: 30° left & right
- Muzzle velocity: 1,925 ft/s (587 m/s)
- Maximum firing range: 19,667 yd (17,984 m)
- References: Chris Bishop & Nigel Evans

The BL 7.2-inch howitzer was a heavy artillery piece used by the British Army throughout the Second World War.

== History ==
In 1940 the British Army concluded that the only heavy howitzer available to it, the First World War-era BL 8-inch howitzer, had insufficient range for the conditions of the Second World War. As a stopgap the decision was made to re-line the barrels to a smaller calibre and develop a new range of ammunition to achieve the desired ranges.

=== Marks I–IV ===
The 8-inch barrels were re-lined to 7.2 inches (183 mm) and the old carriages were retained although the original steel rimmed wheels were replaced with new pneumatic balloon-tyre wheels, as was consistent with the motorisation of the British Army. The new four-charge ammunition increased the range to 16,900 yd (15,500 m), but when fired at full charge the recoil caused the weapon to rear violently and jump backwards. To help counter this, two wedge shaped ramps were placed behind the wheels although the gun could sometimes still jump over them, presenting a hazard to crews. Marks I–IV differed only in the original 8-inch barrel used and the type of conversion; some barrels and carriages were also supplied from US First World War stocks.

=== Mark V ===
In 1944 several 7.2-inch barrels were placed in the US Carriage M1 used by the 155 mm Long Tom already in use by the British Army, becoming the BL 7.2-inch howitzer Mk V. Few Mk Vs were produced and it was never issued to batteries, as it was apparent that the Carriage M1 was capable of accepting greater recoil forces.

=== Mark 6 ===
The BL 7.2-inch howitzer Mk 6 (there was a shift from Roman numerals) retained the Carriage M1 of the Mk V but had a new 7.2-inch 6 ft 5 in (1.96 m) longer barrel than previous marks and a fifth charge was added to the ammunition. The longer barrel and extra charge provided an increase in range to 19,600 yd (17,900 m) and the new carriage also provided a far more stable platform, greatly increasing accuracy. The Mk 6 was considered a highly effective gun and it was retained in service after the war.

== Use ==
The original marks performed well. The first 7.2-inch howitzers were issued to batteries from mid-1942 and used in action in North Africa and in 1944 following the Normandy landings. In Burma they were provided as a pool of two guns per corps and used by Regiments as required. By the end of 1944, most of the earlier marks had been replaced by the Mk 6. The usual gun tractor for the 7.2-inch howitzer in the early war years was the Scammell Pioneer, although this was never available in sufficient numbers and from late 1943 the Pioneer was supplemented by the Albion CX22S. The BL 7.2-inch howitzer was usually employed in two four-gun batteries (alongside two four-gun batteries equipped with the 155 mm Long Tom) of "Heavy" regiments of Army Group Royal Artillery (AGRA) units, providing heavy fire support for British and Commonwealth troops. The Mk 6 remained in British Army service until the early 1960s.

=== Indian Army service ===
In 1957, Indian Army raised 60 Heavy Regiment from the erstwhile J&K Bodyguard Cavalry. The unit was unique in its composition of four batteries with four Mk 6 BL 7.2-inch Howitzers in each battery, unlike the standard three-battery (six guns each) composition of other Indian artillery regiments. The guns of 60 Heavy Regiment saw combat in the 1965 and 1971 wars against Pakistan. In the early 1990s 60 Heavy Regiment was converted to a field regiment and the guns were passed on to 61 Heavy Regiment. They were finally retired from service by the late 1990s.

=== User units ===
Newfoundland

- 59 (Newfoundland) Heavy Regiment

United Kingdom (Royal Artillery)

- 1 Heavy Regiment
- 32 Heavy Regiment
- 51 (Lowland) Heavy Regiment – North West Europe Campaign
- 52 (Bedfordshire Yeomanry) Heavy Regiment – North West Europe Campaign
- 53 Heavy Regiment
- 54 Heavy Regiment
- 55 Heavy Regiment
- 56 Heavy Regiment – Mediterranean Theatre and North West Europe Campaign
- 58 Heavy Regiment
- 60 Heavy Regiment
- 61 Heavy Regiment
- 75 Heavy Regiment
- 171 Heavy Regiment
- 114th (Sussex) Field Regiment – 2 gun section during Burma Campaign
- 8th (Belfast) Heavy Anti-Aircraft Regiment – 2 gun section during Burma Campaign
- 52nd (London) Heavy Anti-Aircraft Regiment – 2 gun section during Burma Campaign
- 56th (Cornwall) Heavy Anti-Aircraft Regiment – 2 gun section during Burma Campaign
- 67th (York and Lancaster Regiment) Heavy Anti-Aircraft Regiment – 2 gun section during Burma Campaign
- 101st Heavy Anti-Aircraft Regiment – 2 gun section during Burma Campaign

India (Regiment of Artillery)

- 143 Heavy Regiment Artillery (TA) (1951-1957)
- 60 Heavy Regiment (now 60 Medium Regiment) (1957-1991)
  - 128 Hy Bty
  - 129 Hy Bty
  - 130 Hy Bty
  - 131 Hy Bty (later transferred to 106 Med Regt after one gun was put out of action)
- 61 Heavy Regiment (1991-1996)

== Gallery ==
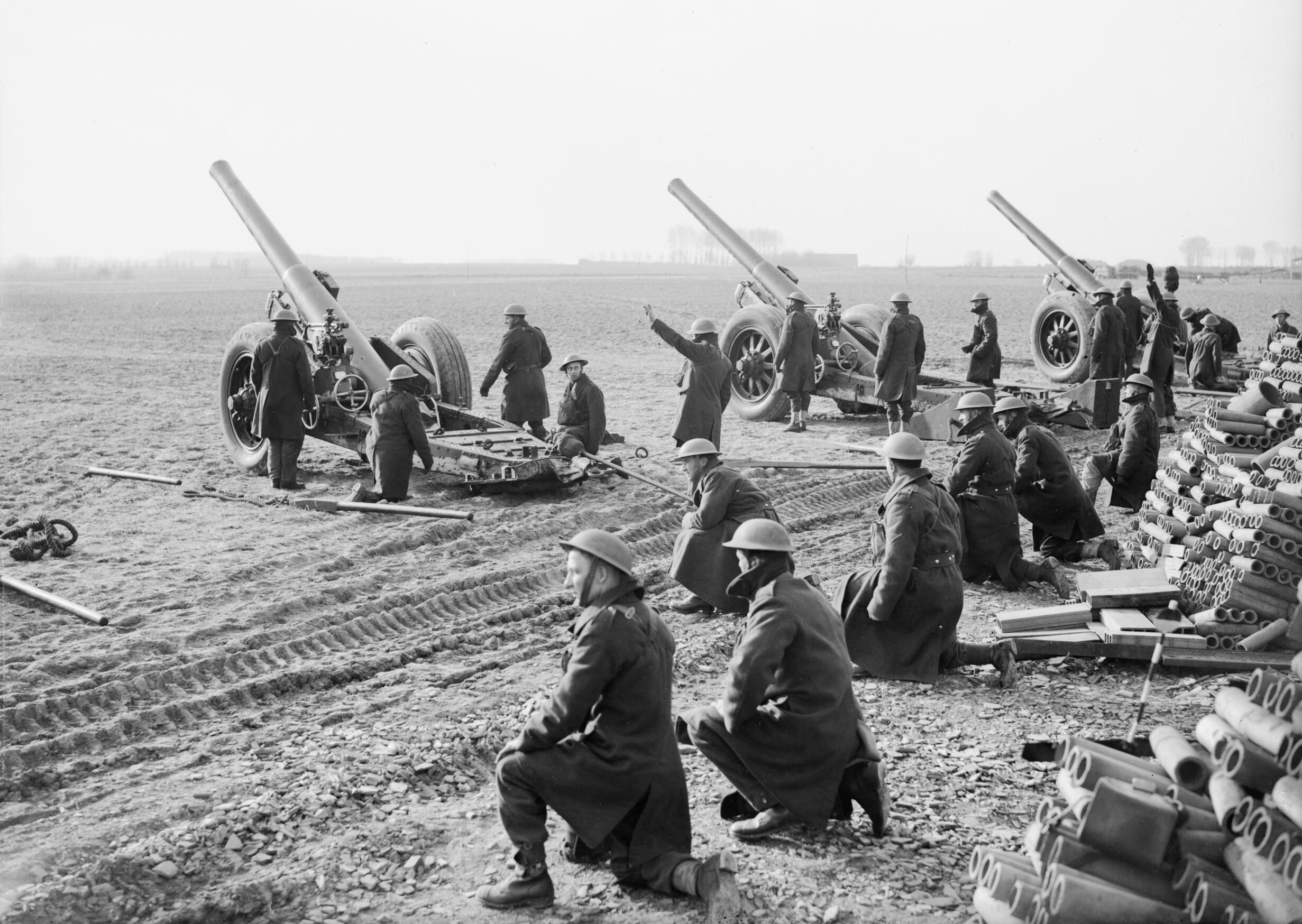

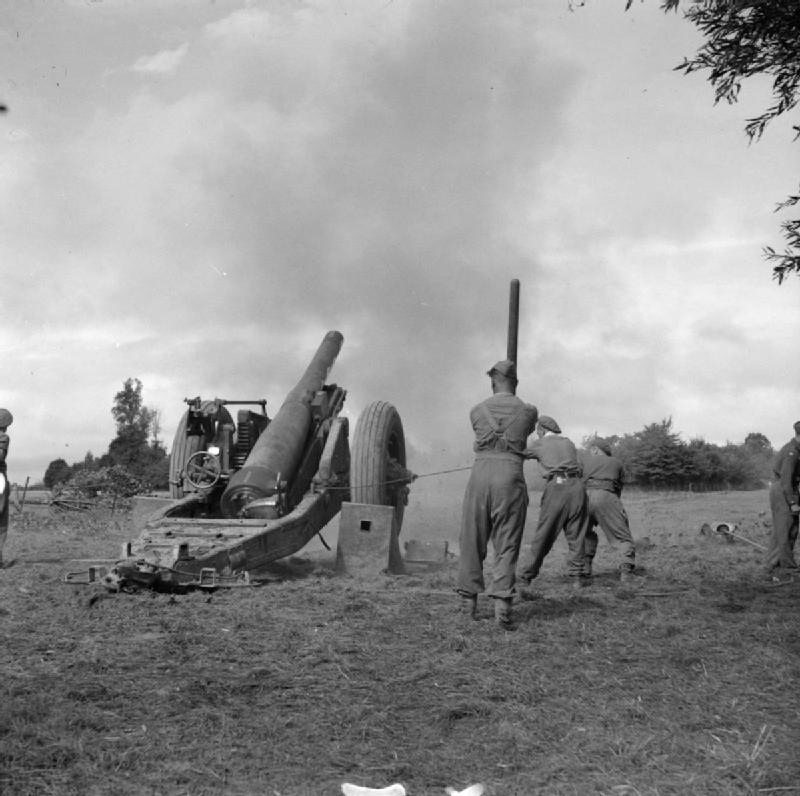

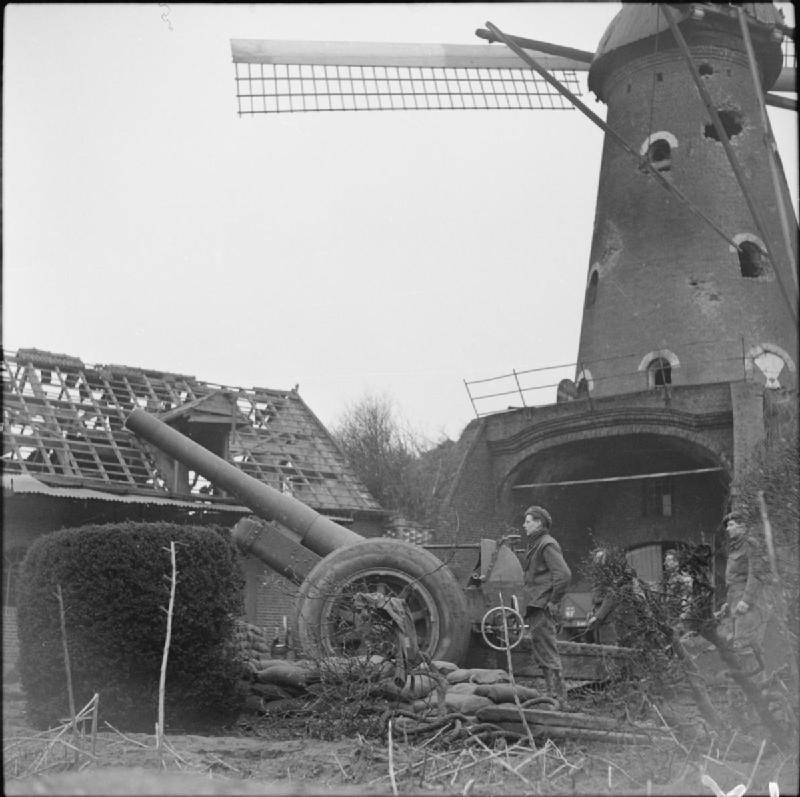

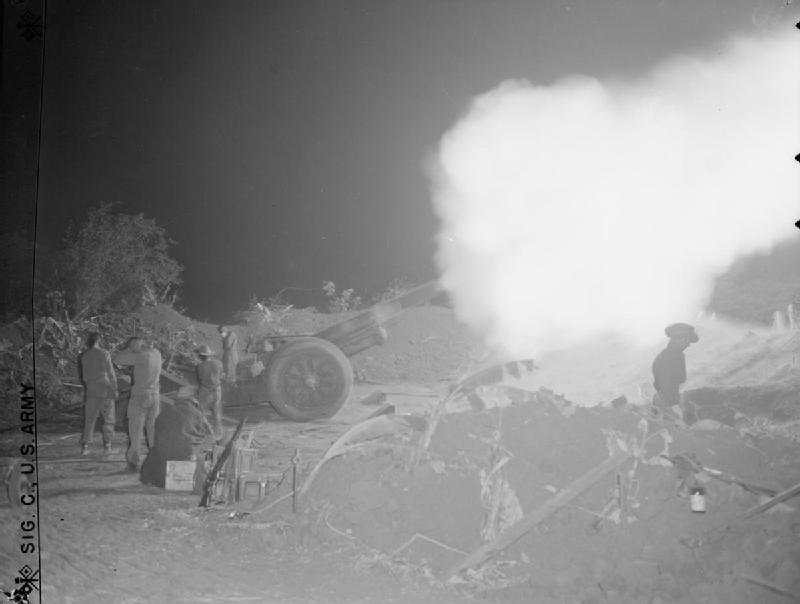

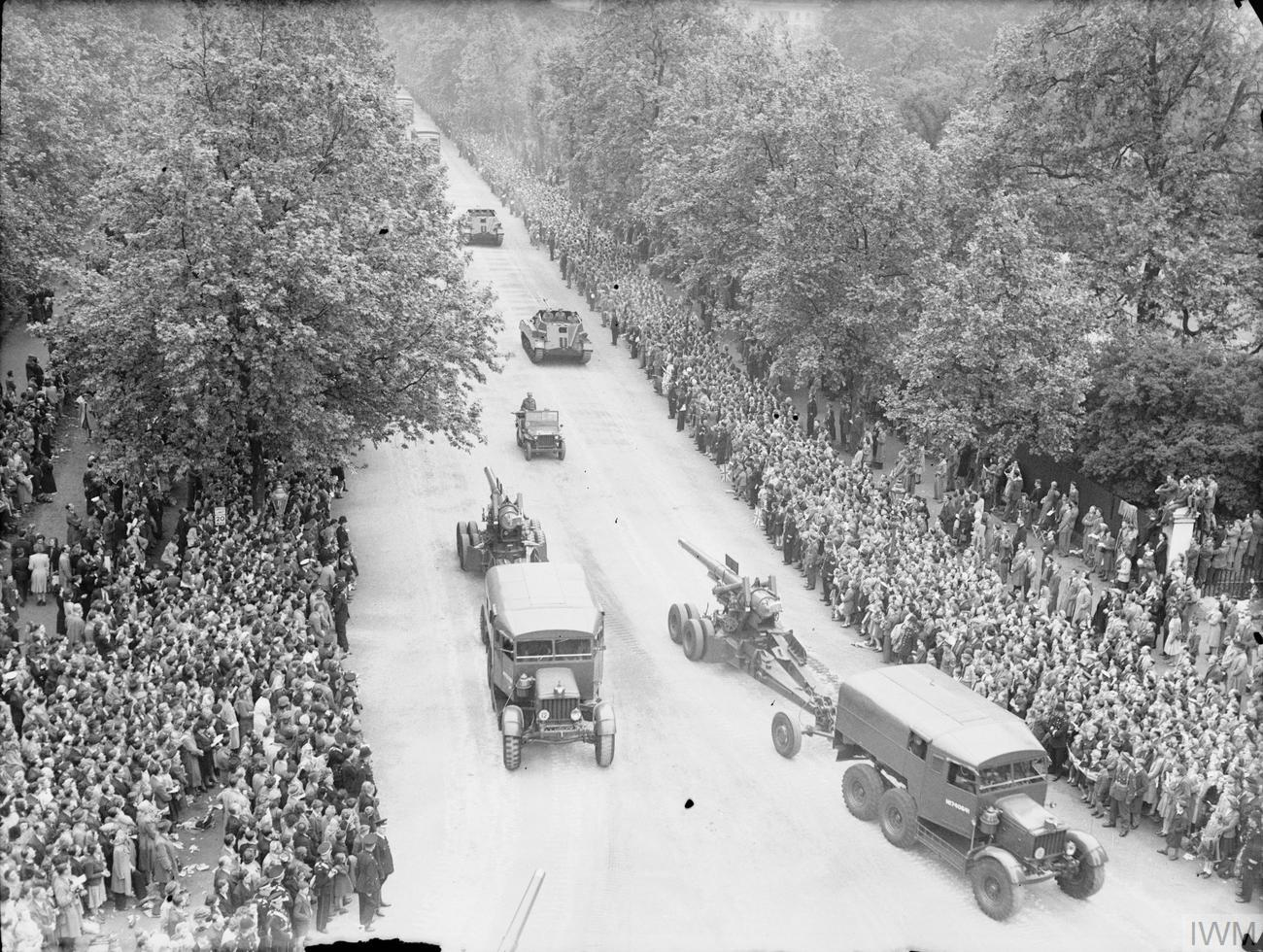

== See also ==
- List of howitzers
- 8 inch Howitzer M1 – US equivalent, sharing the Carriage M1
- 203 mm howitzer M1931 (B-4) – approximate Soviet equivalent
