= 128th Brigade =

In military terms, 128th Brigade or 128th Infantry Brigade may refer to:

- 128th Heavy Mechanized Brigade, a unit of the Ukrainian Territorial Defense Forces
- 128th Mountain Assault Brigade, a unit of the Ukrainian Ground Forces
  - Missile strike on the award ceremony of the 128th Mountain Assault Brigade
- 128th (Hampshire) Brigade, later the 128th Infantry Brigade, a unit of the British Army during the First and Second World Wars
- 128th Aviation Brigade, an aviation brigade of the United States Army

== See also ==
- 128th Division (disambiguation)
- 128th Regiment (disambiguation)
