= 128th Field Artillery Regiment =

Military unit history

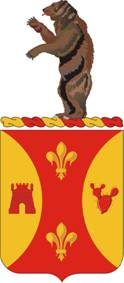
- Active: 1917-1919; 1921-1945; 1947-2008
- Country: United States
- Allegiance: United States
- Branch: Field artillery
- Size: Regiment
- Motto: Show Me
- Engagements: World War I; Meuse-Argonne; Alsace 1918; Lorraine 1918; World War II; Normandy; Northern France; Rhineland; Ardennes-Alsace; Central Europe

The 128th Field Artillery Regiment was a field artillery regiment of the United States Army, part of the Missouri Army National Guard that traced its lineage to 1917. The 1st Battalion, the only active unit of the regiment, was inactivated in 2008.

== History ==
In 1812, two batteries of light artillery militia were organized in St. Louis, Missouri, and their garrison was later transferred to nearby St. Charles, now a northern suburb of St. Louis. In 1846, during the Mexican-American War, President James K. Polk ordered General Stephen W. Kearny to raise 3,000 volunteers, and St. Louis contributed one battery of artillery volunteers. The volunteers performed valiantly in a battle at Sacramento, Mexico, fighting until they ran out of ammunition and finally mounting their artillery horses and charging like cavalry, capturing several Mexican cannons and a battle flag. The battery was disbanded at New Orleans, Louisiana, in 1848. During the American Civil War, St. Louis militia units were split between the Union and Confederate sides. After the outbreak of the Spanish-American War in April 1898, St. Louis again contributed a battery of artillery volunteers, which was sent to Puerto Rico and was mustered out on 30 November 1898.

=== World War I ===
The 1st Field Artillery Regiment was constituted on 29 June 1917 in the Missouri National Guard as the 1st Field Artillery, and organized from new and existing units. It was drafted into Federal service on 5 August 1917 after American entry into World War I, redesignated on 1 October 1917 as the 128th Field Artillery, and assigned to the 35th Division. After training at Camp Doniphan, Oklahoma, it sailed to France, where it participated in the Meuse-Argonne Offensive. The regiment arrived at the port of Boston on the troopship SS Vedic on 22 April 1919 and was demobilized on 19 May at Fort Riley, Kansas.

=== Interwar period ===
A regiment of field artillery was organized on 4 December 1920 in the Missouri National Guard as the 1st Battalion, Field Artillery, later expanded, reorganized, and redesignated 29 January 1921 as the 1st Field Artillery Regiment. Per the terms of the National Defense Act of 1920, the regiment was redesignated on 1 October 1921 as the 128th Field Artillery, and subsequently assigned to the General Headquarters Reserve. The regimental headquarters was organized and federally recognized on 21 April 1923 at Columbia, Missouri. Under authority of a letter dated March 19, 1927, the regiment was converted from a horse-drawn to a portée regiment, where the guns were transported on the beds of trucks. The enlisted personnel of the Headquarters Battery were composed primarily from students enrolled in the Reserve Officers Training Corps program at the University of Missouri in Columbia, while the enlisted personnel of Battery C were composed primarily from students from the Missouri State Teachers College (now Missouri State University) in Springfield. The regiment was assigned on 1 October 1933 to the 25th Field Artillery Brigade (GHQR), and converted from portée to truck-drawn on 1 January 1935.

==== State duty and other activities ====
The regiment, or elements thereof, was called up to perform the following state duties. The 2nd Battalion performed railway strike duty at Poplar Bluff, Missouri, from 14 July–13 August 1922. Battery F acted as the salute battery for General John J. Pershing's dedication of the Liberty Memorial at Kansas City, Missouri, in November 1926. Battery B acted as the salute battery for President Franklin D. Roosevelt's dedication of the original Mark Twain bridge across the Mississippi River at Hannibal, Missouri, on 2 September 1936.

The regiment conducted annual summer training most years at Fort Riley, and some years at Camp Clark, Missouri, or Fort Sill, Oklahoma. For at least two years, in 1939 and 1940, the regiment also trained twenty-nine battery-grade field artillery officers of the Organized Reserve's 102nd Division at Fort Sill and Camp Ripley, Minnesota.

=== World War II ===
The 128th Field Artillery was inducted into federal service on 25 November 1940, prior to U.S. entry into World War II, and moved to Fort Jackson, South Carolina, where it arrived on 10 December 1940. The regiment was assigned to the First Army and attached to the Fort Bragg Provisional Field Artillery Brigade. It was transferred on 3 December 1941 to Camp Blanding, Florida. As part of a restructuring of the Army's antitank forces in December 1941, the regiment's antitank elements (the antitank platoons in each of the two battalion headquarters batteries) were disbanded and the personnel were absorbed by other units of the regiment, with the equipment transferred to the 630th Tank Destroyer Battalion at Fort Jackson. On 15 September 1942, the regiment was transferred to Camp Chaffee, Arkansas. In the fall of 1942, the 6th Armored Division adopted a new table of organization which gave it three armored field artillery battalions, the 128th, 212th, and 231st. On 11 October 1942, the 128th Armored Field Artillery Battalion was constituted and assigned to the division. On 26 November, the 1st Battalion, 128th Field Artillery, was reorganized and redesignated as the 128th Armored Field Artillery Battalion, and the remainder of the regiment was disbanded; many of the extra Missouri men went as fillers to the newly constituted 231st Armored Field Artillery Battalion. After fighting in northern France, Belgium, Luxembourg, and Germany in 1944-1945, the battalion was inactivated on 27 November 1945 at Camp Kilmer, New Jersey, and relieved from assignment to the 6th Armored Division.

=== Cold War to 2007 ===
The regiment was redesignated on 30 June 1946 as the 128th Field Artillery Battalion and assigned to the 35th Infantry Division. It was reorganized and federally recognized on 14 November 1947 with headquarters at Mexico, Missouri. It was consolidated on 15 April 1959 with the 128th Field Artillery (less the 1st Battalion), to form the 128th Artillery, a parent regiment under the U.S. Army Combat Arms Regimental System, to consist of the 1st and 2nd Howitzer Battalions, elements of the 35th Infantry Division. It was reorganized on 22 May 1962 to consist of the 1st and 2nd Howitzer Battalions, elements of the 35th Infantry Division, and the 3rd Missile Battalion. Reorganized 1 April 1963 to consist of the 1st and 2nd Howitzer Battalions and the 3rd Missile Battalion. Reorganized 1 December 1964 to consist of the 1st and 2nd Howitzer Battalions, the 3rd Missile Battalion, and Battery F. Reorganized 1 January 1966 to consist of the 1st and 2nd Howitzer Battalions, the 3rd Battalion, and Battery F. Reorganized 15 January 1968 to consist of the 1st and 3rd Battalions. Reorganized 1 March 1969 to consist of the 1st Battalion. Redesignated 1 March 1972 as the 128th Field Artillery. Withdrawn 1 June 1989 from the Combat Arms Regimental System and reorganized under the United States Army Regimental System.

As part of a reorientation in the strength of the Missouri National Guard more towards support units like military police and the activation of a new maneuver enhancement brigade, the 1st Battalion, the sole remaining active unit of the regiment, was inactivated on 13 July 2008. Former members were reassigned to other Missouri Army National Guard units.

== Heraldry ==
- Coat of arms: On a red shield two yellow fleurs-de-lis in pale, on two yellow flaunches a red castle and red cactus.
  - Symbolism: The shield is red for Artillery. The Spanish castle represents service in Puerto Rico during the Spanish-American War. The cactus is for service on the Mexican Border, 1916 and the fleurs-de-lis for service in France, World War I with the 35th Division. The flaunches divide the shield in three parts to represent three important periods of the unit's history.
- Crest: That for units of the Missouri National Guard; on a wreath of the colors yellow and red, a grizzly bear rampant in natural colors
- Motto: Show Me
- Distinctive unit insignia: Shield and motto of the coat of arms.
