= Portee =

Truck-mounted artillery

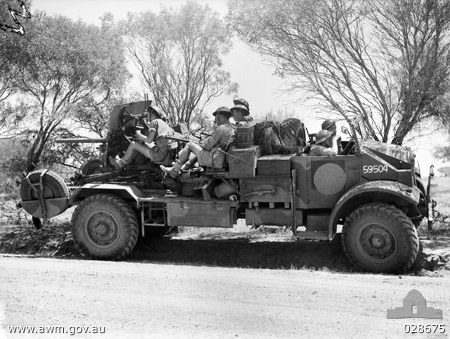
Australian Army 2-pounder portée during an exercise in 1942

Portée is the practice of carrying an artillery piece on a truck which can be fired from the vehicle or quickly dismounted and fired from the ground. The term is most often used to describe anti-tank equipments used by the British, Commonwealth and imperial forces in the Western Desert Campaign of the Second World War. Modern terms for mounting weapons on vehicles are technical or gun truck.

== Interwar ==
=== US Cavalry ===
portée cavalry was horse cavalry – horses and riders – carried in trucks or other vehicles. The cavalry is thus mechanised for strategic and operational movement and horse-mounted for tactical deployment. Portée cavalry units were briefly tested in the American army during the interwar period change from fully-horsed cavalry to fully-mechanized cavalry but were generally found to be overcomplicated and not worthwhile. (Note: One aspect of this defence was continued testing of portée Cavalry, the use of trucks to move fresh horses to the battle where Troopers would mount and operate as traditional horse cavalry... The specially-built tractor-trailers were capable of rapidly transporting eight fully-equipped Troopers with their horses to any staging point.)

== British Army, 1939–1943 ==
=== 2-pounder anti-tank gun portée ===
An Ordnance QF 2 pounder (40 mm) anti-tank gun mounted on a Morris CS8 15 cwt truck, Chevrolet WA or WB 30-cwt truck, Canadian Military Pattern Ford F30 or Chevrolet C30 trucks and fired over the tailboard.

=== 6-pounder anti-tank gun portée ===
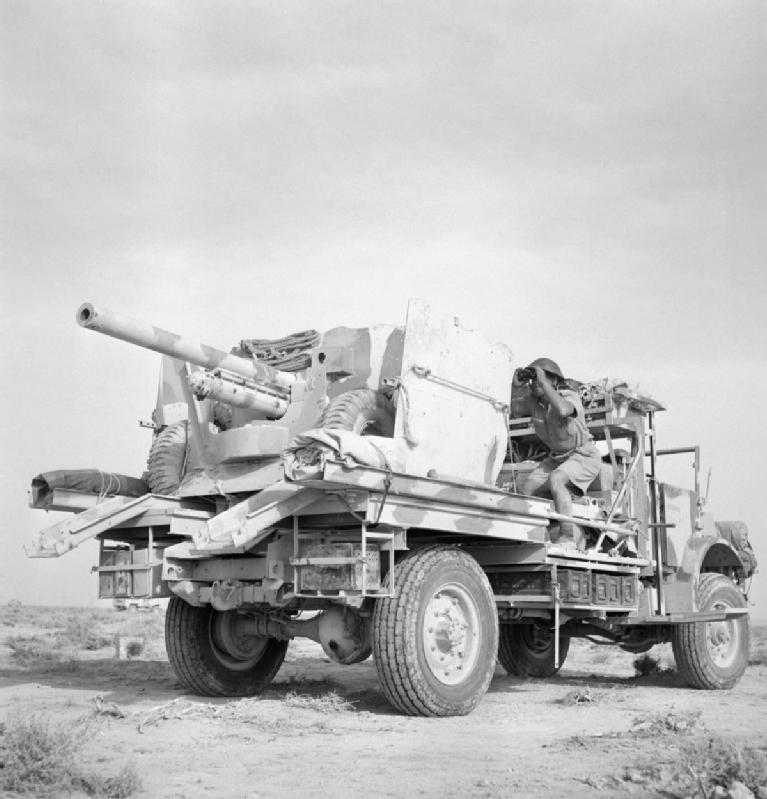
Six-pounder portée, 1942

An Ordnance QF 6 pounder (57 mm) anti-tank gun, mounted on a Bedford QLT 3-ton lorry or Austin K5 3-ton lorry. Both vehicles had a special frame-only body carrying the gun, crew, ammunition and the rarely used side shields. A Canadian Military Pattern lorry (CMP) Ford F60 or Chevrolet C60 with cut down number 13 cab was similarly used. The size and weight of the new gun led to it being dismounted before going into action more often than the smaller and lighter 2-pounder.

=== 20 mm anti-aircraft gun portée ===
An Oerlikon 20 mm anti-aircraft gun mounted on a Morris 15 cwt truck

=== 25 mm anti-tank gun portée ===
A 25 mm Hotchkiss anti-tank gun mounted on a Morris 15 cwt truck

=== 37 mm anti-tank gun portée ===
A Bofors 37 mm anti-tank gun mounted on a Bedford MW or Morris CS8 15cwt used by 106 Royal Horse Artillery during Operation Compass at Beda Fomm.

=== Deacon ===
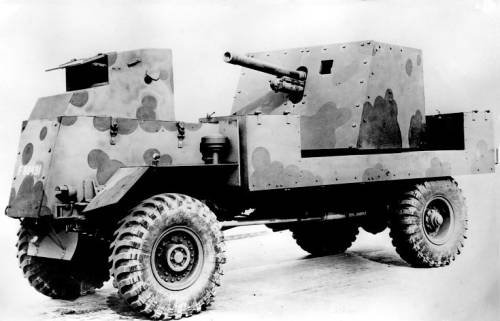
AEC Deacon

The AEC Mk I Gun Carrier "Deacon" introduced in 1942 in the Desert War was a more sophisticated successor to the portée. The 6-pounder gun was mounted within a three-sided and roofed armoured shield on a turntable on the back of an armoured AEC Matador chassis. The limited traverse of the gun was mitigated by the Matador driver turning the vehicle. A battery of Deacons were issued per anti-tank regiment as a mobile reserve but by the end of the North African Campaign in May 1943 were obsolete and were replaced by US M10 tank destroyers before operations began in Europe.

== Operational history ==
=== 105th Anti-tank Regiment RA ===
Changes of equipment from 1941 to 1944.

- 1941–1942: Western Desert, 2-pounder portée
- 1942–1943: Western Desert and Tunisia, 2 batteries 6-pounder portée, 2 batteries Deacon
- 1943: Sicily, 2 batteries 6-pounder towed, 2 batteries 17-pounder towed
- 1944: Italy, 1 battery 6-pounder towed, 1 battery 17-pounder towed, 2 batteries M 10 (12 guns per battery)

== See also ==
- Tachanka
- Technical (vehicle)
