= Multi leaf spring =

Multi-leaf springs are widely used for the suspension of cars, trucks and railway wagons. A multi-leaf spring consists of a series of flat plates, usually of semi-elliptical shape. The flat plates are called leaves of the spring. The leaf at the top has maximum length. The length gradually decreases from the top leaf to the bottom leaf. The longest leaf at the top is called master leaf and is bent at both ends to form the spring eyes. Two bolts are inserted through these eyes to fix the leaf spring to the automobile body. The leaves are held together by means of two U-bolts and a center clip. Rebound clips are provided to keep the leaves in alignment and prevent lateral shifting of the leaves during operation. At the center, the leaf spring is supported on the axle. Multi-leaf springs are provided with one or two extra full-length leaves in addition to the master leaf and the graduated length leaves. The extra full-length leaves are provided to support the transverse sheer force.

A A multi spring is not simply a bunch of pieces of steel put together, but is an engineered system designed to provide support, stability and safety to a vehicle. In a multi-leaf spring the length and the make-up of each leaf is important because each leaf is designed to carry a proportionate amount of load and stress. Also, each leaf is designed to provide support to the leaf above and below it.

Analysis For this purpose, the leaves are divided into two groups namely, master leaf along with graduated-length leaves forming one group and extra full-length leaves forming the other. The group of graduated-length leaves along with the master leaf can be treated as a triangular plate. It is assumed that individual leaves are separated and the master leaf placed at the center, then the second leaf is cut longitudinally into two halves.
