= 128th Illinois Infantry Regiment =

128th Regiment Illinois Volunteer Infantry
- Active: November 23, 1862, to April 1, 1863
- Country: United States
- Allegiance: Union
- Branch: Infantry

The 128th Regiment Illinois Volunteer Infantry was an infantry regiment that served in the Union Army during the American Civil War.

== Service ==
The 128th Illinois was organized at Camp Butler, Illinois, and mustered into Union service on November 4, 1862.

The regiment was assigned to District of Columbus, XVI Corps, Department of the Tennessee from November 1862 to April 1863.

=== Losses ===
The regiment suffered 1 officer and 34 men killed by disease and 700 men by desertion.

=== Disbanded ===
Following the Emancipation Proclamation, the regiment suffered 700 desertions. The regiment was disbanded on April 1, 1863, by order the War Department. Citing "an utter want of discipline" in the regiment, Adjutant General Lorenzo Thomas dismissed the regiment's commanding officer Colonel Robert M. Hundley, 29 other officers, and the regimental chaplain, from Union service on April 4.

The few remaining men of the 128th Illinois were consolidated into a detachment under command of First Lieutenants W. A. Lemma, William M. Cooper, and Assistant Surgeon George W. French and reassigned to 9th Illinois Volunteer Infantry Regiment (3 Years).

== See also ==
- List of Illinois Civil War Units
