= 128th Regiment of Foot =

Infantry regiment of the British Army

The 128th Regiment of Foot was an infantry regiment of the British Army, created in 1794 and disbanded in 1796.
