= 128th New York Infantry Regiment =

- New York flag
- Active: September 5, 1862, to February 22, 1865
- Country: United States
- Allegiance: Union
- Branch: Infantry
- Engagements: American Civil War: Battle of Deserted House; Siege of Suffolk

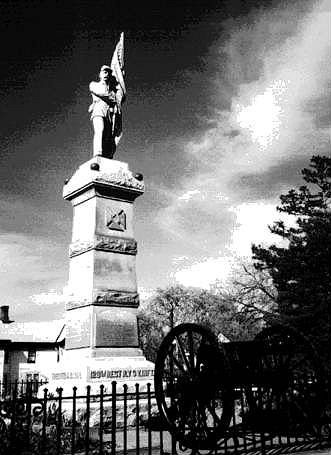
Monument to the 128th in Poughkeepsie, NY

The 128th New York Infantry Regiment, nicknamed Old Steady, was a volunteer regiment from Dutchess County and Columbia County in upstate New York, during the American Civil War. Formed in Hudson, New York, on September 5, 1862, by Col. David S. Cowles, the regiment was made up of volunteers from the surrounding towns and villages.

== Organization ==
Volunteers were recruited by town and the 11 companies of the regiment were organized by region:

- Company A: Hudson, Ghent, Chatham, Austerlitz, New Lebanon, Canaan, Germantown and Claverack
- Company B: Washington, Amenia, Dover, Pawling, North East, Stanford and Pine Plains
- Company C: Rhinebeck, Milan, Red Hook, Clinton, Stanford, and Hyde Park
- Company D: Poughkeepsie, Hyde Park, Beekman, Fishkill, Pine Plains, Pleasant Valley, Clinton, Livingston, Greenport and LaGrange
- Company E: Kinderhook, Chatham, Valatie, Hillsdale and Austerlitz
- Company F: Fishkill, Pawling, Pine Plains, North East, Washington, Amenia and Hudson
- Company G: Stuyvesant, Hudson, Ancram, Clermont, Taghkanick, Gallatin, Claverack, New Lebanon, Stockport, Ghent and Hillsdale
- Company H: Fishkill, Poughkeepsie, Hyde Park and Beekman
- Company I: Poughkeepsie
- Company K: Chatham, Hudson, Claverack, Greenport, Hyde Park, Clinton, Germantown, Red Hook and Copake

== Campaigns ==
Organized at Camp Kelly on the fairgrounds in Hudson, New York (a marker can be found today in the town indicating the location of the camp). The regiment was mustered into service on September 4, 1862, and left for Washington, D.C., September 5, 1862, aboard the steamship Oregon which took them to New York City. From here the regiment rode aboard railroad cars to Baltimore. Camp Millington, where the regiment practiced drill, was set up just outside Baltimore. The 128th's first attempt to engage the enemy took them on a rapid jaunt to Gettysburg in an effort to confront General J.E.B. Stuart's Confederates. This proved uneventful however as Stuart retreated upon learning of the Union Army's approach; History would not be made in Pennsylvania until the following year.

The regiment was attached to defenses of Washington, D.C., and Baltimore, Maryland, until December 1862 when the regiment boarded a ship, destination unknown, and headed south. The regiment soon learned they would be attached to General Nathaniel Banks' Department of the Gulf whose ultimate goal would be to open the Mississippi River to the Union. While aboard the ship Arago, sickness and disease infested the ranks. After a stop at Fortress Monroe where the regiment witnessed some of the famous Union ships including the ironclad Monitor, the regiment made its way to New Orleans.

The regiment was attached to the 1st Brigade, Sherman's Division, Department of the Gulf, until January, 1863 and saw duty at Camps Parapet and Chalmette until March 1863. Their first true engagement with the rebels took place at Pontachoula, Louisiana, on May 13; The soldiers confiscated Confederate wares including cotton bales and a small steamboat. The regiment moved to New Orleans, and thence to Port Hudson, Louisiana, May 21–23. The regiment would then play a major part in the Siege of Port Hudson from May 24 through July 9. This included skirmishing on Slaughter's Field on May 26, followed by the major assaults on the parapets of Port Hudson on May 27 and June 14. The regiment participated in the surrender of Port Hudson on July 9. The 128th lost many men wounded and killed including their Colonel David S. Cowles. During this time they were part of the 1st Brigade, 2nd Division, 19th Army Corps, Department of the Gulf to July 1863.

After the siege of Port Hudson was over and the Union Army took full control of the Mississippi River, the regiment moved to Baton Rouge July 11, thence to Donaldsonville July 15. The regiment performed provost and guard duty there and at Baton Rouge until March 1864. The 128th would then participate in the Red River Campaign from March 23 to May 22. Initial duty placed them in the rear of the assault at Alexandria from March 25 to April 12 and Grand Ecore April 13. The regiment then were swept up in the Union Army's retreat to Alexandria from April 21–26. This included an engagement at Cane River Crossing on April 23; The regiment's new colonel, James Smith, would later be breveted general for bravery in this fight. Men then assisted with the construction of the famous dam needed to save the Union fleet of ships at Alexandria April 30- May 10. Once the fleet was rescued the army continued its retreat to Morganza Bend from May 13–20. This would include two additional engagements at Mansura Plains on May 16 and at Atchafalaya on May 17. The regiment then remained at Morganza Bend until July 3 as part of the 2nd Brigade, 1st Division, 19th Army Corps, to February 1864 and 3rd Brigade, 2nd Division, 19th Army Corps, Department of the Gulf, to July 1864.

From Morganza the men moved to New Orleans, and thence to Fortress Monroe, Virginia, and then quickly to Washington, D.C., July 3–29.

The regiment then participated in General Phil Sheridan's Shenandoah Valley Campaign from August 7 to November 28 as part of the Army of the Shenandoah, Middle Military Division, to January 1865. At this time they were starting on a campaign to stop Confederate General Jubal Early's pestering of Washington and also to lay waste to the Valley, then considered the "breadbasket" of the South.

In the Valley, the 128th fought first at the Battle of Opequon or (Third Winchester) on September 19, 1864; The Confederates were beaten and chased south "up" the valley. Several days later there was another major engagement at Fisher's Hill on September 22, 1864, and again the Rebels were beaten and pursued still further south. The Union army gave chase for a considerable distance with the cavalry doing most of the fighting. When Sheridan felt the Confederates had been pushed sufficiently south and were no longer a threat, he then turned the army about and proceeded to carry out the second part of the plan; To lay waste to the Valley.

Moving north "down" the Valley, the Union troops burned crops, food, barns and anything that might be useful to the Confederate Army. The Rebels stayed close at their heels. When the Army reached the northern end of the Valley just over Cedar Creek, they encamped awaiting next steps from the leadership. Sheridan left the Army here while he went to Washington to discuss plans with General Grant. The 128th were encamped on the north side of Cedar Creek just off the main north–south route, the "Valley Pike". Being in this position, the 128th were the regiment to have many men stationed as advanced pickets on the other side of Cedar Creek some distance out on the pike, guarding the approach. By now the Confederates were desperate, having lost two large battles and being seriously low on food and supplies as well as men of fighting capability. One of their top generals, John Brown Gordon made a trip to the top of a nearby mountain during the day and looking down had a birdseye view of the entire Union Army. From here he was able to devise a plan whereby the Confederates would leave behind everything that might make noise, and at night march around the base of the mountain, cross the Shenandoah and attack the Union army at first light. The rebels main attack fell on the left flank at approximately 5:00 a.m. with smaller thrusts at the center and on the right. It was a chilly and foggy morning, October 19, 1864; The majority of the soldiers were still sleeping when the attack began to start the Battle of Cedar Creek.

The 128th being on the Pike, were off to the right of the main attack. The loud shock of the assault on their left startled the pickets and left them wondering what was going on. Very shortly after this bullets started flying at them, and the men began to return fire, but, realizing they had no support and that they were quickly being cut off from any chance of escape, they ran for the bridge. Many of the men made it back across but a majority of them were caught.

The fight continued on with the Confederates routing the Union Army in the morning attack. The Union troops retreated a mile or so and began to reform and regroup. The Confederates slowed their chase, taking time to stop and plunder the Union camps. Meanwhile, the Union General Sheridan, who'd been asleep twenty miles north of Middletown and Cedar Creek in Winchester, gallantly raced to rejoin his army. Once there, Sheridan rallied his troops, attacked and retook the camps lost in the morning fight. The Confederates were routed and once again chased south on the Valley Pike. Unfortunately for those Union prisoners captured in the morning fighting, including the men of the 128th, the Union Army never caught up to them as they chased the fleeing rebels. After capture these prisoners were marched out right away and traveled nearly 90 miles to Staunton, Virginia. where they boarded trains for Richmond. There the men were taken to the infamous Libby Prison. For the most part, higher-ranking officers remained here and were shortly paroled while the men of the ranks were taken further south to Salisbury Prison in North Carolina. Here they remained for close to five months until February 22, 1865, at which time they were released.

== Mail-in ballot fraud scheme ==
In the fall of 1864, Orville Wood, a merchant from Clinton County and supporter of Abraham Lincoln in the 1864 presidential election, was tasked to visit hometown troops and "look after the local ticket." After seeing evidence of mail-in ballot fraud in another regiment and a hospital, Wood gained the trust of Moses Ferry, representative of Democratic governor Horatio Seymour in Baltimore, and set out to expose the fraud. The scheme extended beyond Washington, D.C., and Baltimore, back to New York—in one example, a General J.A. Ferrell wrote to political operative Edward Donahue Jr.: "Inclosed in this package you will find tickets, also a list of names of the actual residents of Columbia County, now members of the 128th Regiment. With my best wishes for your success." Wood reported multiple such operations he discovered to authorities, and less than two weeks before the election on October 27, 1864, Ferry and Donahue were tried before a military commission. Ferry confessed and offered up names of other conspirators, while Donahue continued to trial and was convicted, partly on Wood's testimony. Both were sentenced to life in prison, with Lincoln's approval.

== Legacy ==
The 128th has a monument on the battlefield at Cedar Creek in Middletown, Virginia, in the location of their camp preceding the Battle of Cedar Creek. Additionally there is a monument to the regiment in Poughkeepsie, New York, on Reservoir Square at S. Clinton St. and Cannon St.

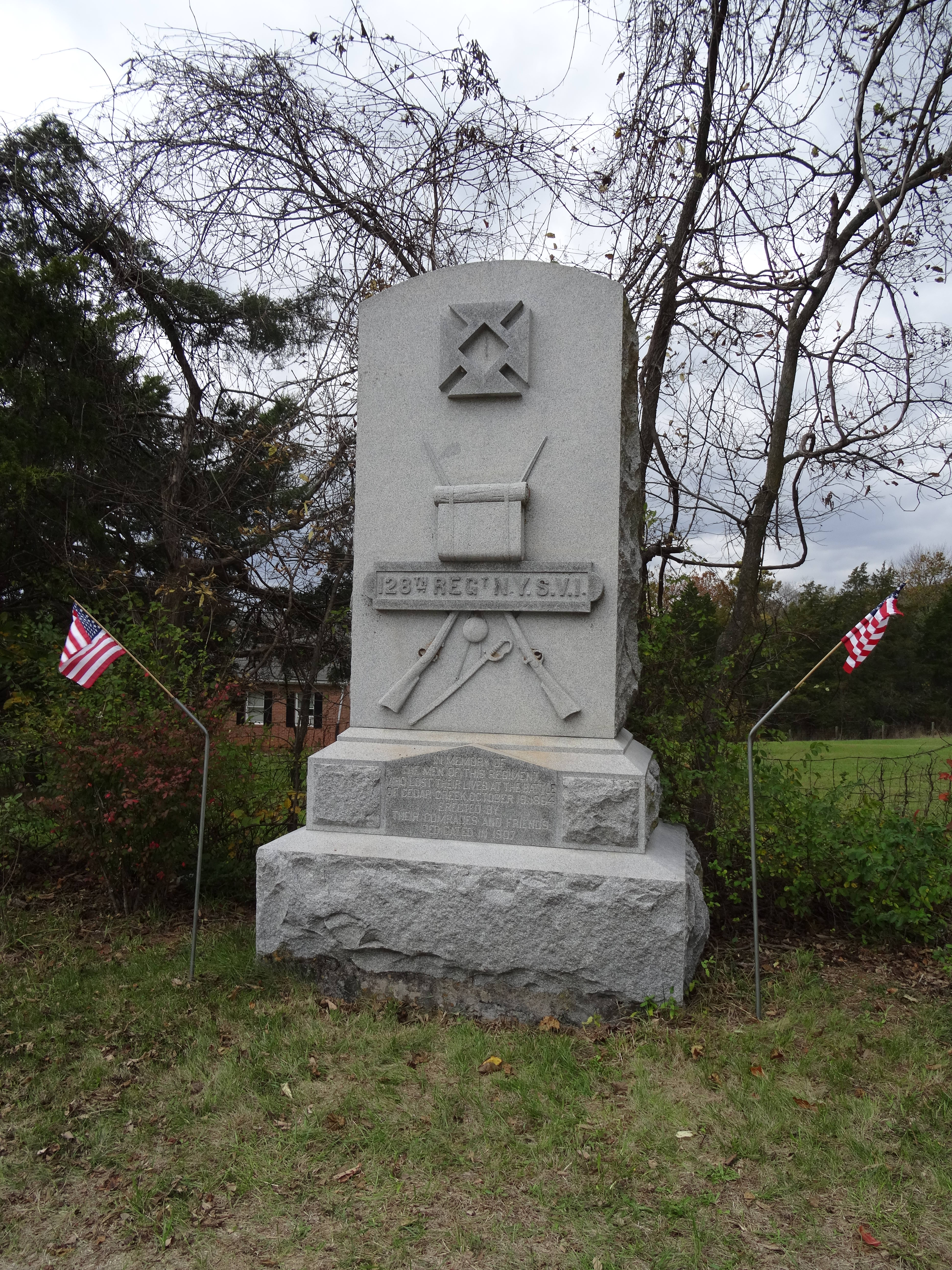
Monument at Cedar Creek

== See also ==
- List of New York Civil War regiments
