= Safety valve =

Device for releasing excess pressure in a system

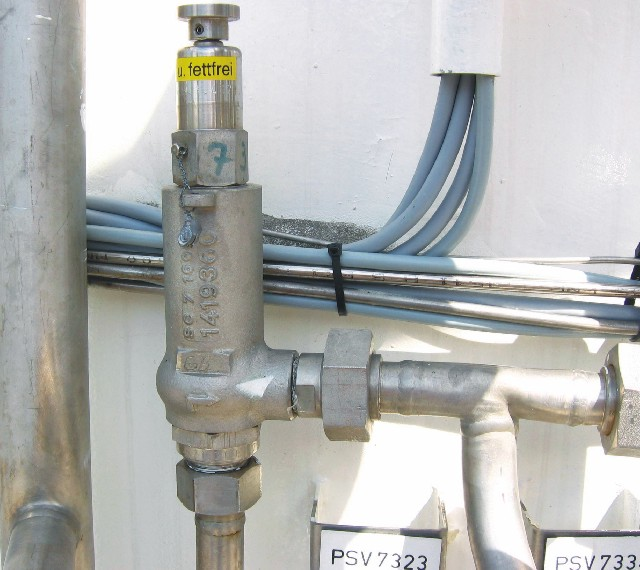
An oxygen safety relief valve

DN250-safety valves

A safety valve is a valve that acts as a fail-safe. An example of safety valve is a pressure relief valve (PRV), which automatically releases a substance from a boiler, pressure vessel, or other system, when the pressure or temperature exceeds preset limits. Pilot-operated relief valves are a specialized type of pressure safety valve. A leak tight, lower cost, single emergency use option is a rupture disk.

Safety valves were first developed for use on steam boilers during the Industrial Revolution. Early boilers operating without them were prone to explosion unless carefully operated.

Vacuum safety valves (or combined pressure/vacuum safety valves) are used to prevent a tank from collapsing while it is being emptied, or when cold rinse water is used after hot CIP (clean-in-place) or SIP (sterilization-in-place) procedures. When sizing a vacuum safety valve, the calculation method is not defined in any norm, particularly in the hot CIP / cold water scenario, but some manufacturers have developed sizing simulations.

The term safety valve is also used metaphorically.

== Function and design ==
A cross-section of a proportional-safety valve

The earliest and simplest safety valve was used on a 1679 steam digester and utilized a weight to retain the steam pressure (this design is still commonly used on pressure cookers); however, these were easily tampered with or accidentally released. On the Stockton and Darlington Railway, the safety valve tended to go off when the engine hit a bump in the track. A valve less sensitive to sudden accelerations used a spring to contain the steam pressure, but these (based on a Salter spring balance) could still be screwed down to increase the pressure beyond design limits. This dangerous practice was sometimes used to marginally increase the performance of a steam engine.

In 1856, John Ramsbottom invented a tamper-proof spring safety valve that became universal on railways. The Ramsbottom valve consisted of two plug-type valves connected to each other by a spring-laden pivoting arm, with one valve element on either side of the pivot. Any adjustment made to one of valves in an attempt to increase its operating pressure would cause the other valve to be lifted off its seat, regardless of how the adjustment was attempted. The pivot point on the arm was not symmetrically located between the valves, so any tightening of the spring would cause one of the valves to lift.

Only by removing and disassembling the entire valve assembly could its operating pressure be adjusted, making impromptu "tying down" of the valve by locomotive crews in search of more power impossible. The pivoting arm was commonly extended into a handle shape and fed back into the locomotive cab, allowing crews to 'rock' both valves off their seats to confirm that they were set and operating correctly.

Safety valves also evolved to protect equipment such as pressure vessels (fired or not) and heat exchangers. The term safety valve should be limited to compressible fluid applications (gas, vapour, or steam).

The two general types of protection encountered in industry are thermal protection and flow protection.

For liquid-packed vessels, thermal relief valves are generally characterized by the relatively small size of the valve necessary to provide protection from excess pressure caused by thermal expansion. In this case a small valve is adequate because most liquids are nearly incompressible, and so a relatively small amount of fluid discharged through the relief valve will produce a substantial reduction in pressure.

Flow protection is characterized by safety valves that are considerably larger than those mounted for thermal protection. They are generally sized for use in situations where significant quantities of gas or high volumes of liquid must be quickly discharged in order to protect the integrity of the vessel or pipeline. This protection can alternatively be achieved by installing a high integrity pressure protection system (HIPPS).

== Technical terms ==
In the petroleum refining, petrochemical, chemical manufacturing, natural gas processing, power generation, food, drinks, cosmetics and pharmaceuticals industries, the term safety valve is associated with the terms pressure relief valve (PRV), pressure safety valve (PSV) and relief valve. The generic term is Pressure relief valve (PRV) or pressure safety valve (PSV). PRVs and PSVs are not the same thing, despite what many people think; the difference is that PSVs have a manual lever to open the valve in case of emergency.

- Relief valve (RV): an automatic system that is actuated by the static pressure in a liquid-filled vessel. It specifically opens proportionally with increasing pressure.
- Safety valve (SV): an automatic system that relieves the static pressure on a gas. It usually opens completely, accompanied by a popping sound.
- Safety relief valve (SRV): an automatic system that relieves by static pressure on both gas and liquid.
- Pilot-operated safety relief valve (POSRV): an automatic system that relieves on remote command from a pilot, to which the static pressure (from equipment to protect) is connected.
- Low pressure safety valve (LPSV): an automatic system that relieves static pressure on a gas. Used when the difference between the vessel pressure and the ambient atmospheric pressure is small.
- Vacuum pressure safety valve (VPSV): an automatic system that relieves static pressure on a gas. Used when the pressure difference between the vessel pressure and the ambient pressure is small, negative and near to atmospheric pressure.
- Low and vacuum pressure safety valve (LVPSV): an automatic system that relieves static pressure on a gas. Used when the pressure difference is small, negative or positive and near to atmospheric pressure.

RV, SV and SRV are spring-operated (even spring-loaded). LPSV and VPSV are spring-operated or weight-loaded.

== Legal and code requirements in industry ==
In most countries, industries are legally required to protect pressure vessels and other equipment by using relief valves. Also, in most countries, equipment design codes such as those provided by the ASME, API and other organizations like ISO (ISO 4126) must be complied with. These codes include design standards for relief valves and schedules for periodic inspection and testing after valves have been removed by the company engineer.

Today, the food, drinks, cosmetics, pharmaceuticals and fine chemicals industries call for hygienic safety valves, fully drainable and Cleanable-In-Place. Most are made of stainless steel; the hygienic norms are mainly 3A in the US and EHEDG in Europe.

== Development of the safety valve ==
=== Deadweight lever valves ===
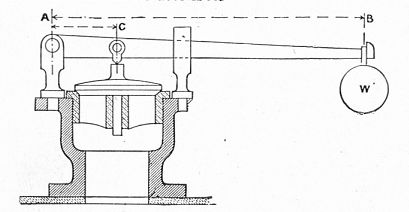
Lever arm safety valve

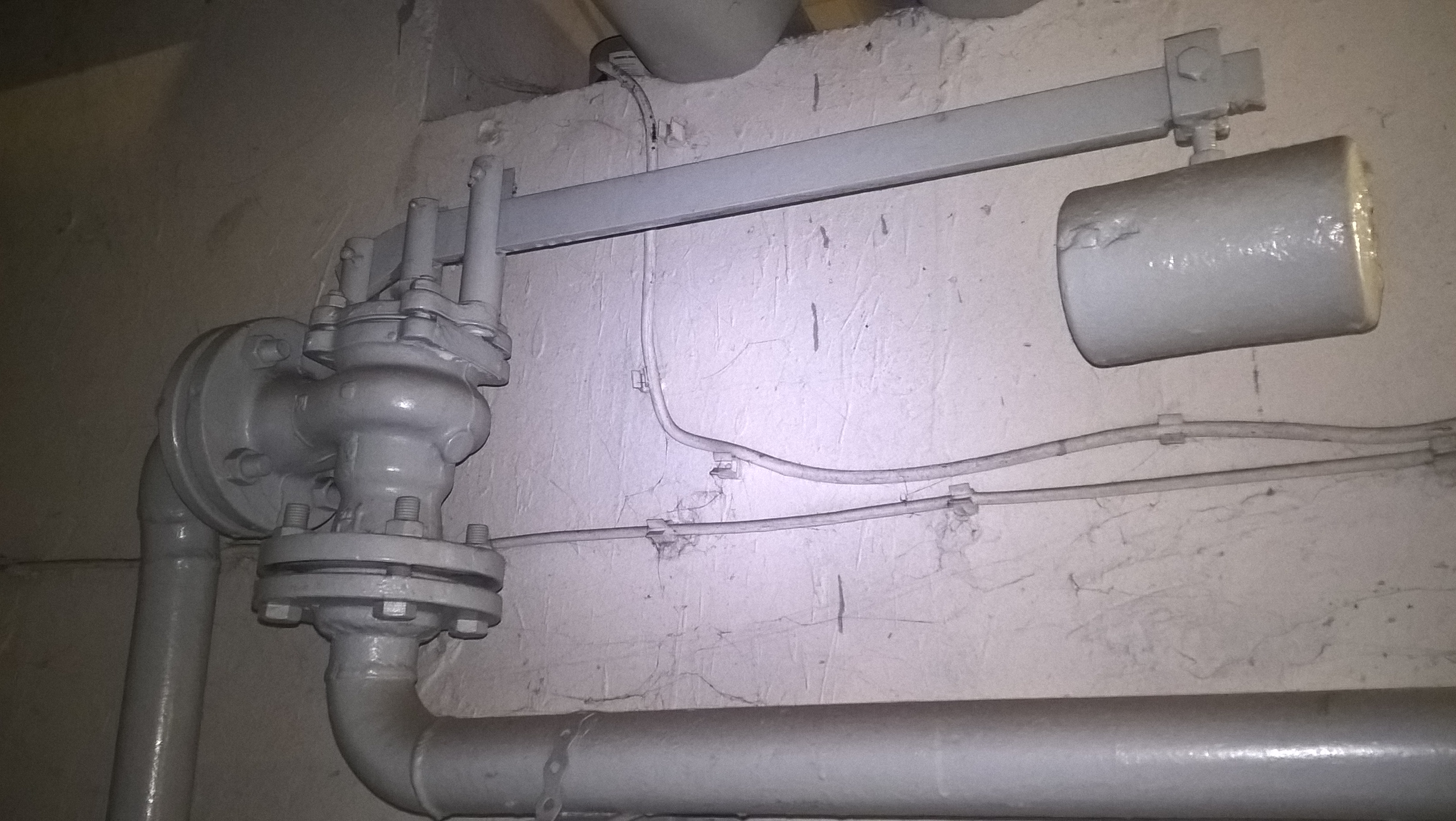
Lever arm safety valve in district heating substation before the renovation. Budapest

The first safety valve was invented by Denis Papin for his steam digester, an early pressure cooker rather than an engine. A weight acting through a lever held down a circular plug valve in the steam vessel. By using a "steelyard" lever a smaller weight was required, also the pressure could easily be regulated by sliding the same weight back and forth along the lever arm. Papin retained the same design for his 1707 steam pump.

Early safety valves were regarded as one of the engineman's controls and required continuous attention, according to the load on the engine. In a famous early explosion at Greenwich in 1803, one of Trevithick's high-pressure stationary engines exploded when the boy trained to operate the engine left it to catch eels in the river, without first releasing the safety valve from its working load. By 1806, Trevithick was fitting pairs of safety valves, one external valve for the driver's adjustment and one sealed inside the boiler with a fixed weight. This was unadjustable and released at a higher pressure, intended as a guarantee of safety.

When used on locomotives, these valves would rattle and leak, releasing near-continuous puffs of waste steam.

==== Direct-acting deadweight valves ====
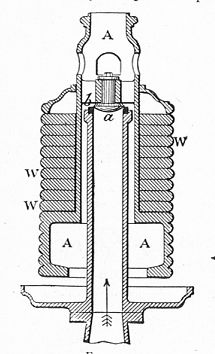
Deadweight safety valve (1909)

Although the lever safety valve was convenient, it was too sensitive to the motion of a steam locomotive. Early steam locomotives therefore used a simpler arrangement of weights stacked directly upon the valve. This required a smaller valve area, so as to keep the weight manageable, which sometimes proved inadequate to vent the pressure of an unattended boiler, leading to explosions. An even greater hazard was the ease with which such a valve could be tied down, so as to increase the pressure and thus power of the engine, at further risk of explosion.

Although deadweight safety valves had a short lifetime on steam locomotives, they remained in use on stationary boilers for as long as steam power remained.

=== Direct spring valves ===
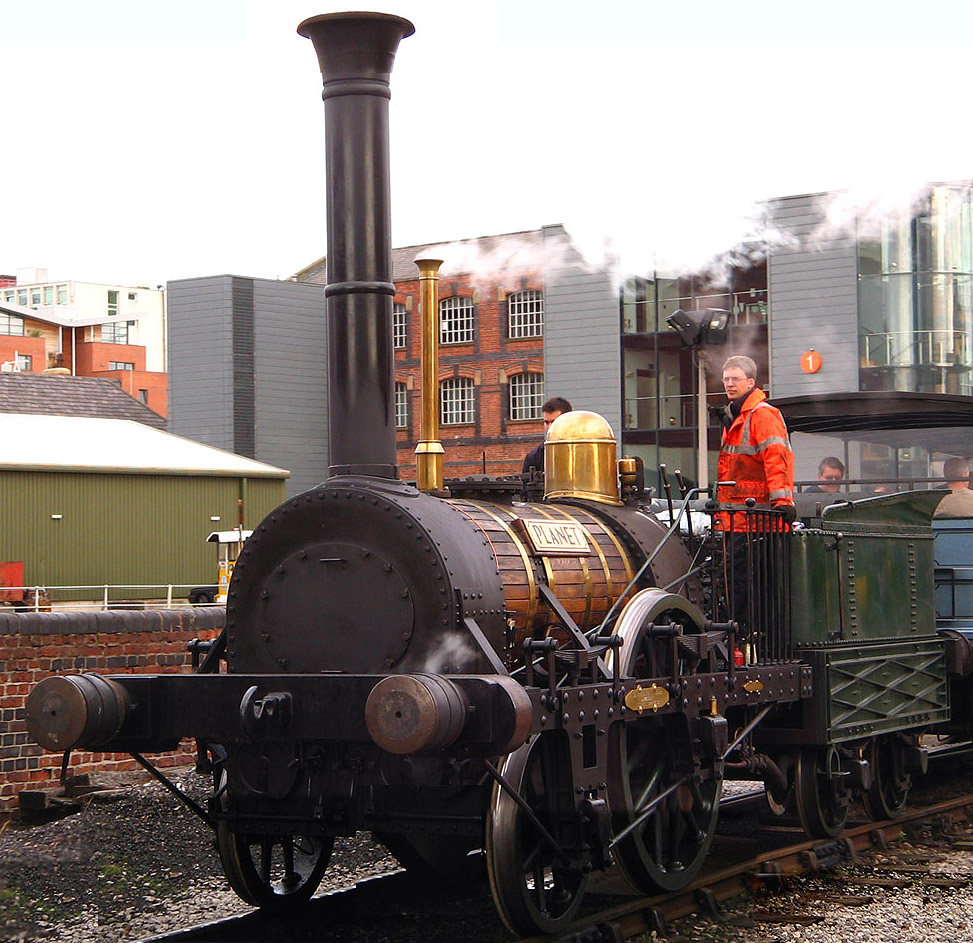
Locomotive Planet (1830), with a brass-cased direct spring valve

Weighted valves were sensitive to bouncing from the rough riding of early locomotives. One solution was to use a lightweight spring rather than a weight. This was the invention of Timothy Hackworth on his Royal George of 1828. Owing to the limited metallurgy of the period, Hackworth's first spring valves used an accordion-like stack of multiple leaf springs.

These direct-acting spring valves could be adjusted by tightening the nuts retaining the spring. To avoid tampering, they were often shrouded in tall brass casings which also vented the steam away from the locomotive crew.

=== Salter spring balance valves ===
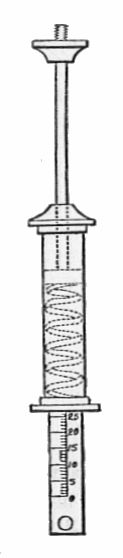
Salter spring balance

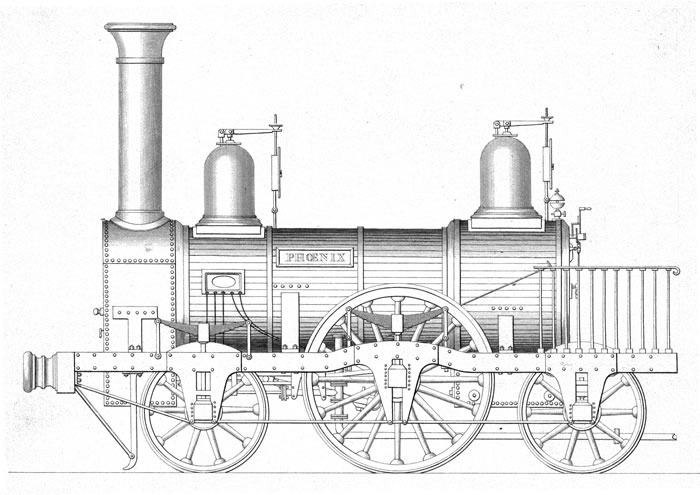
Phoenix (1840) with two sets of Salter spring balance valves

The Salter coil spring balance for weighing, was first made in Britain by around 1770. This used the newly developed spring steels to make a powerful but compact spring in one piece. Once again by using the lever mechanism, such a spring balance could be applied to the considerable force of a boiler safety valve.

The spring balance valve also acted as a pressure gauge. This was useful as previous pressure gauges were unwieldy mercury manometers and the Bourdon gauge had yet to be invented.

==== Lockable valves ====
The risk of firemen tying down the safety valve remained. This was encouraged by them being fitted with easily adjustable wing nuts, the practice of adjusting the boiler's working pressure via the safety valve being an accepted behaviour well into the 1850s. It was later common with Salter valves for them to be fitted in pairs, one adjustable and often calibrated for use as a gauge, the other sealed inside a locked cover to prevent tampering.

==== Paired spring balance valves ====
Paired valves were often adjusted to slightly different pressures too, a small valve as a control measure and the lockable valve made larger and permanently set to a higher pressure, as a safeguard. Some designs, such as one by Sinclair for the Eastern Counties Railway in 1859, had the valve spring with pressure scale behind the dome, facing the cab, and the locked valve ahead of the dome, out of reach of interference.

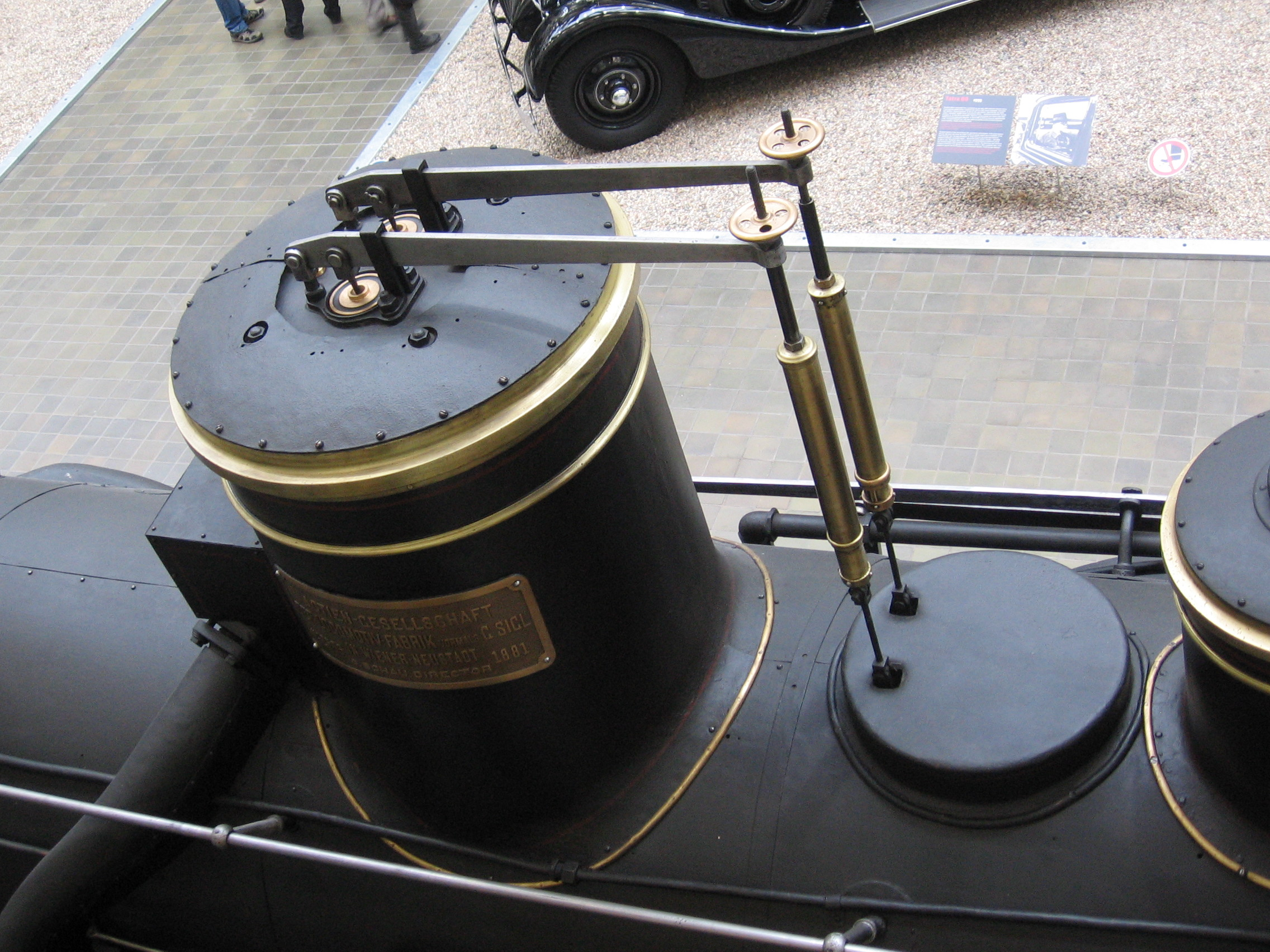
Paired spring-balance safety valves of a ČSD Class 252.0, with hand adjustment wheels

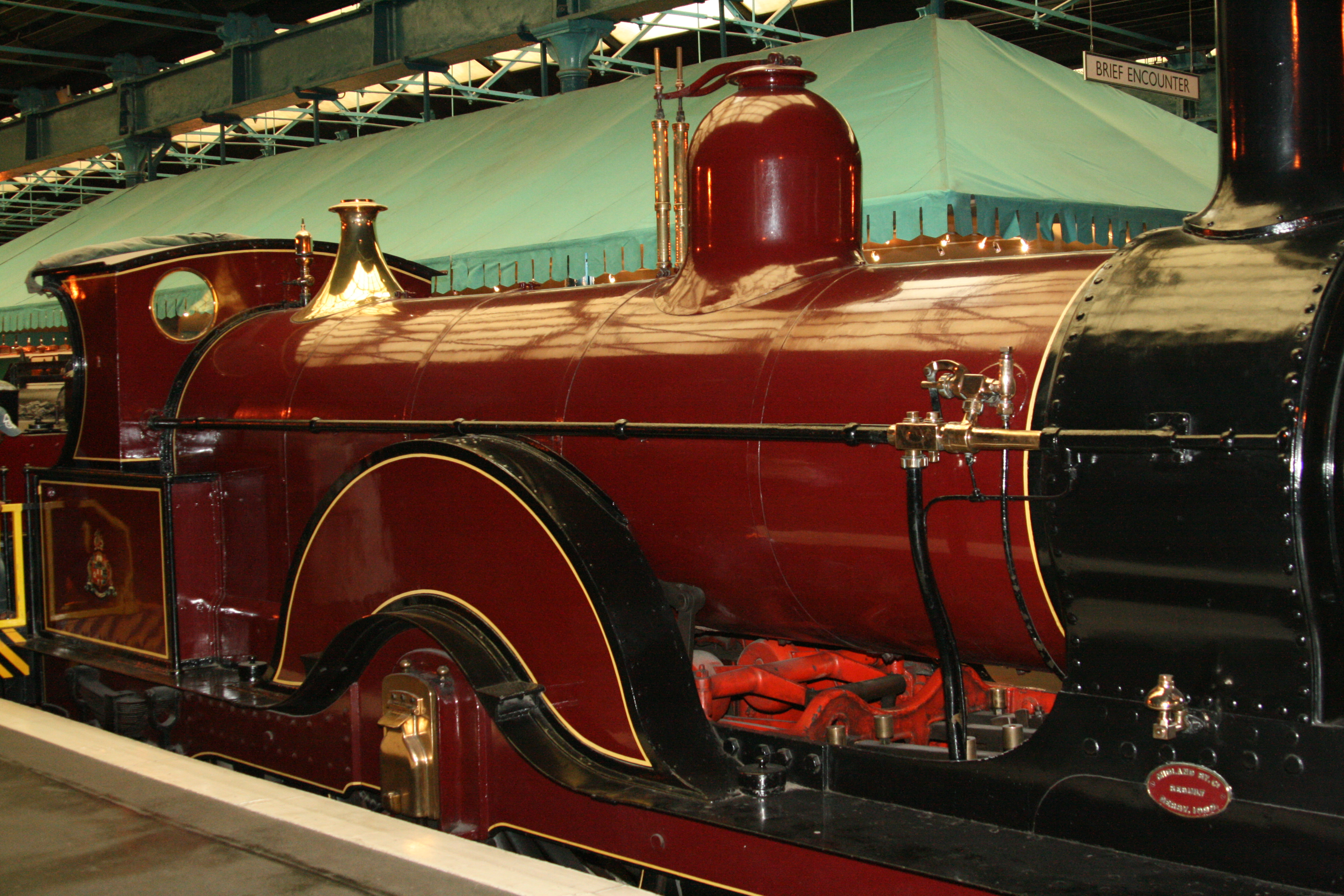
Midland Spinner, showing paired spring-balance safety valves behind the dome

=== Ramsbottom safety valves ===
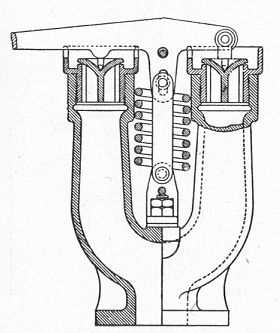
U-shaped Ramsbottom safety valve

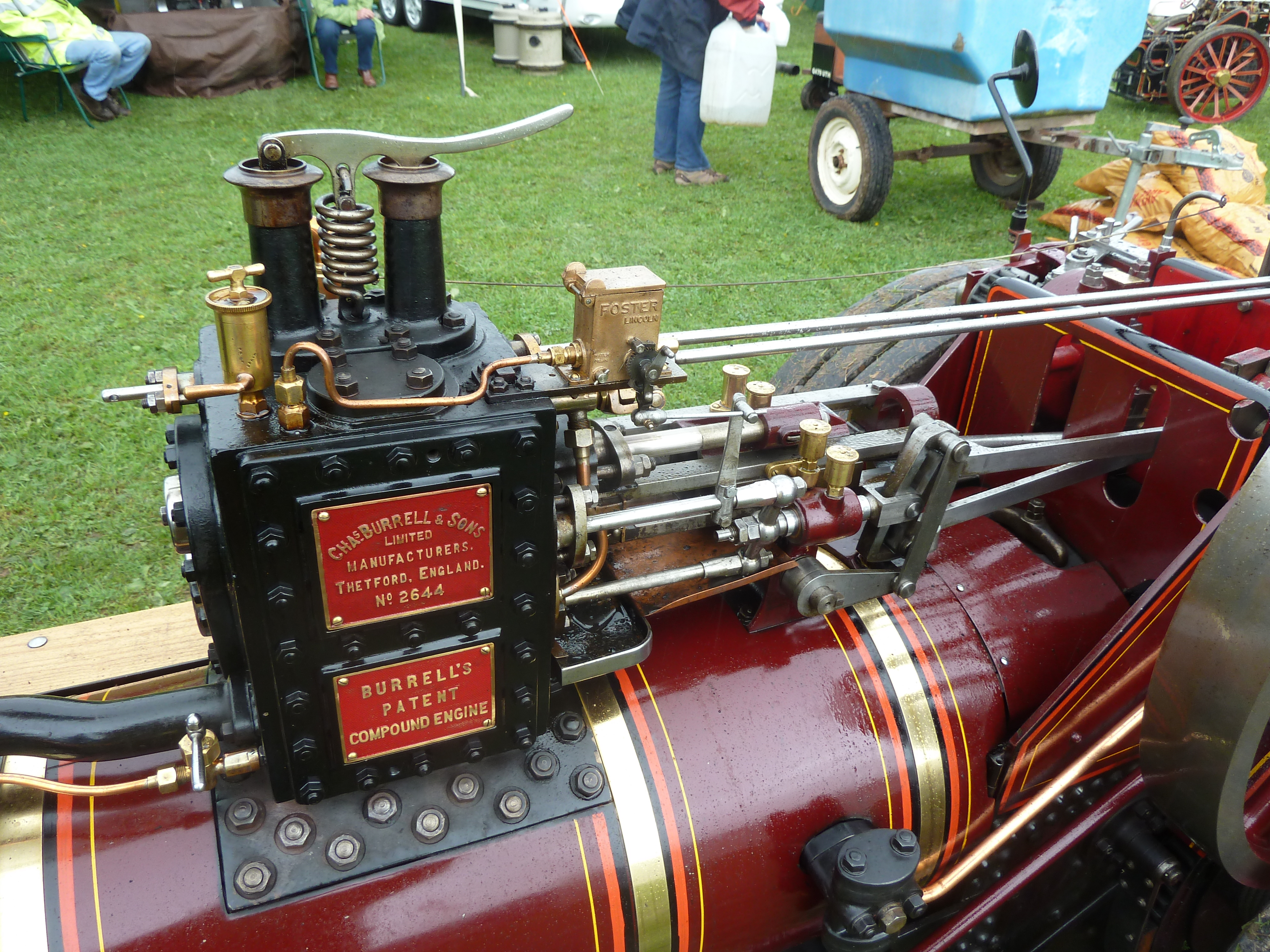
Ramsbottom valves on a model traction engine

In 1855, John Ramsbottom, later locomotive superintendent of the LNWR, described a new form of safety valve intended to improve reliability and especially to be tamper-resistant. A pair of plug valves were used, held down by a common spring-loaded lever between them with a single central spring. This lever was characteristically extended rearwards, often reaching into the cab on early locomotives.

Rather than discouraging the use of the spring lever by the fireman, Ramsbottom's valve encouraged this. Rocking the lever freed up the valves alternately and checked that neither was sticking in its seat. Even if the fireman held the lever down and increased the force on the rear valve, there was a corresponding reduction of force on the forward valve.

Various forms of Ramsbottom valve were produced. Some were separate fittings to the boiler, through separate penetrations. Others were contained in a U-shaped housing fastened to a single opening in the boiler shell. As boiler diameter increased, some forms were even set inside the boiler shell, with the springs housed in a recess inside and only the valves and balance lever protruding outside. These had obvious drawbacks for easy maintenance.

A drawback to the Ramsbottom type was its complexity. Poor maintenance or mis-assembly of the linkage between the spring and the valves could lead to a valve that no longer opened correctly under pressure. The valves could be held against their seats and fail to open or, even worse, to allow the valve to open but insufficiently to vent steam at an adequate rate and so not being an obvious and noticeable fault. Mis-assembly of just this nature led to a fatal boiler explosion in 1909 at Cardiff on the Rhymney Railway, even though the boiler was almost new, at only eight months old.

=== Naylor valve ===
Naylor valves were introduced around 1866. A bellcrank arrangement reduced the strain (percentage extension) of the spring, thus maintaining a more constant force. (Note: See Young's modulus) They were used by the L&Y and NER.

=== "Pop" valves ===
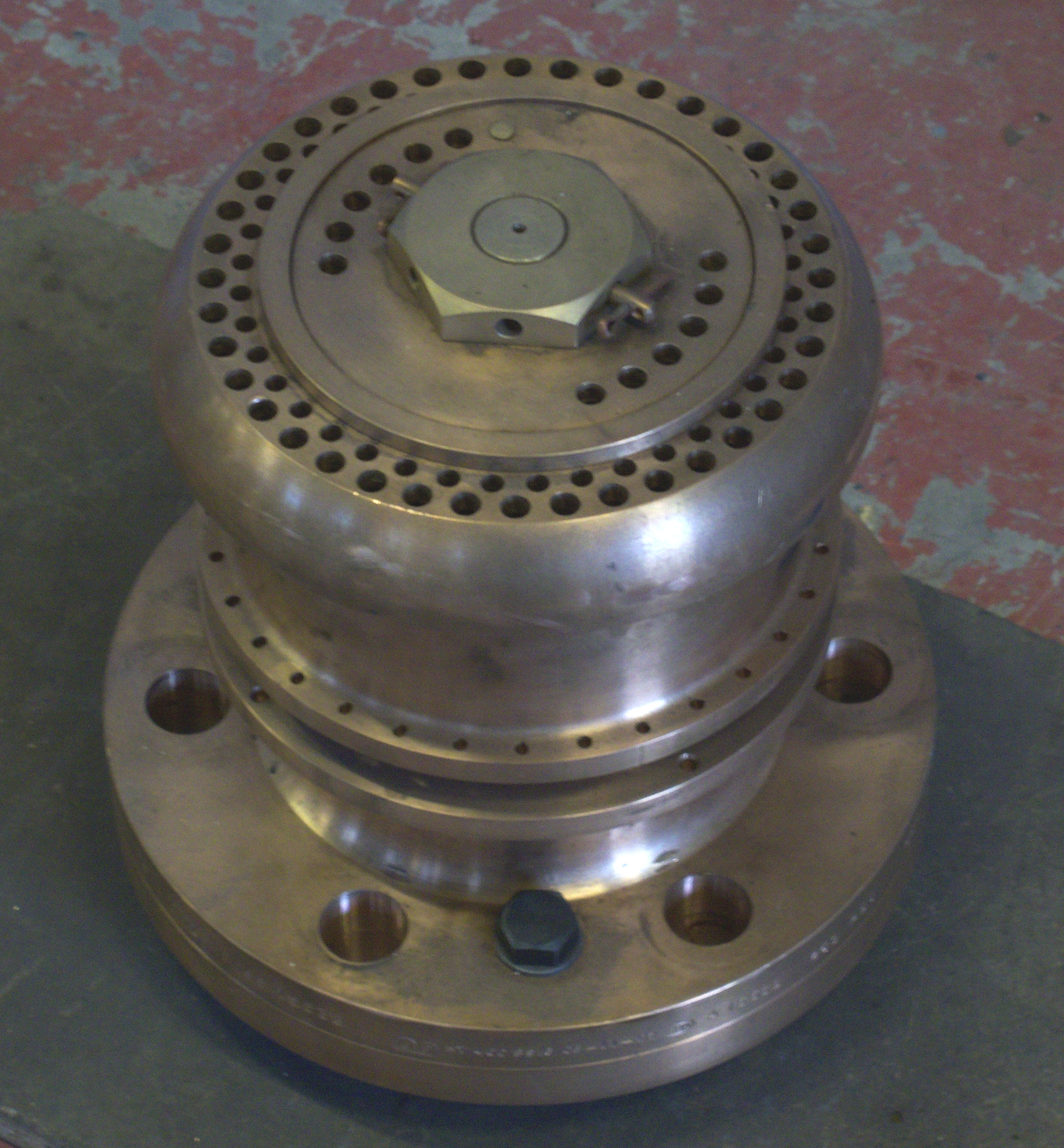
Ross pop valve, from Tornado

All of the preceding safety valve designs opened gradually and had a tendency to leak a "feather" of steam as they approached "blowing-off", even though this was below the pressure. When they opened they also did so partially at first and did not vent steam quickly until the boiler was well over pressure.

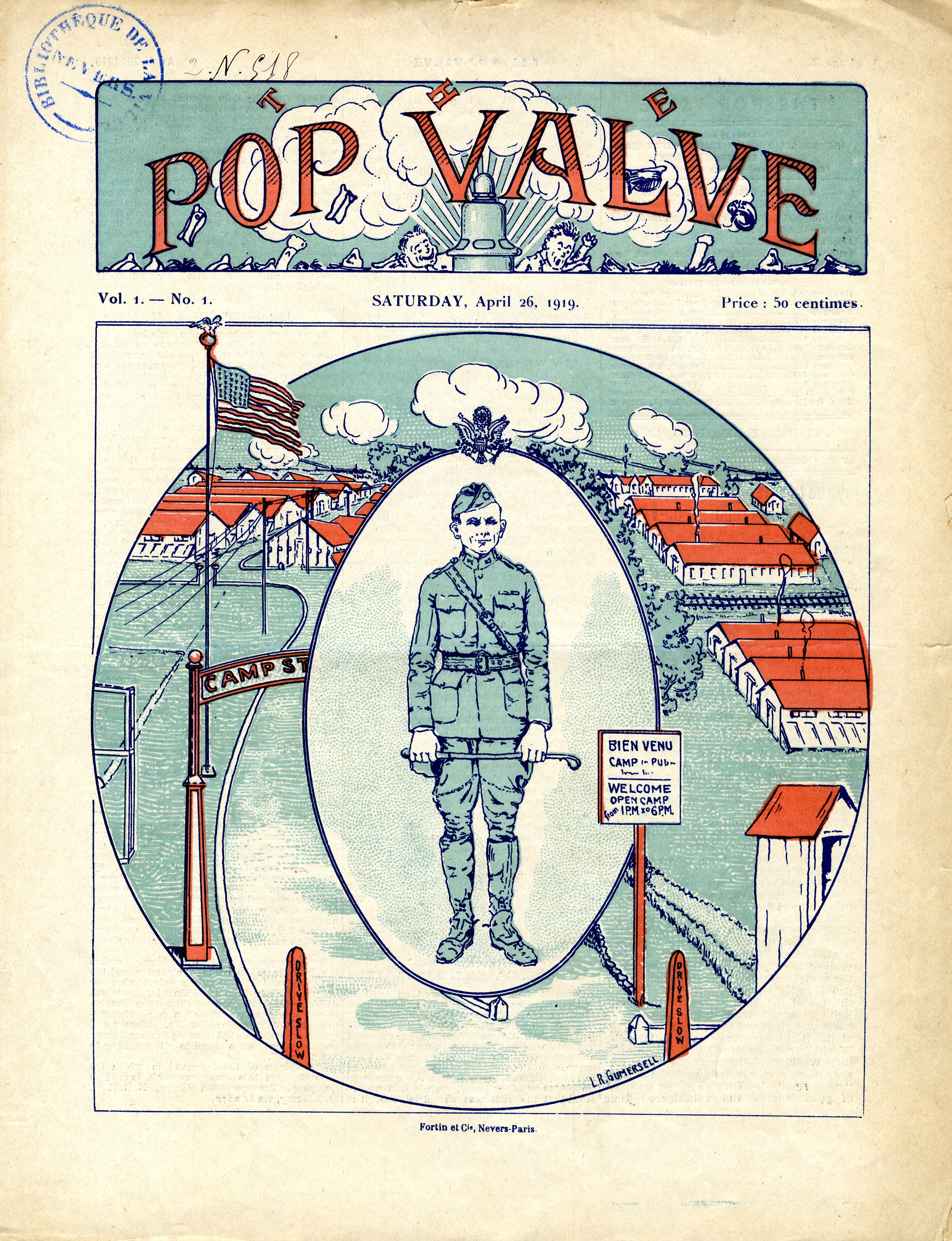
Cover of The Pop Valve, a self-published magazine by the American army Transportation Corps stationed in France in WWI

The quick-opening "pop" valve was a solution to this. Their construction was simple: the existing circular plug valve was changed to an inverted "top hat" shape, with an enlarged upper diameter. They fitted into a stepped seat of two matching diameters. When closed, the steam pressure acted only on the crown of the top hat, and was balanced by the spring force. Once the valve opened a little, steam could pass the lower seat and began to act on the larger brim. This greater area overwhelmed the spring force and the valve flew completely open with a "pop". Escaping steam on this larger diameter also held the valve open until pressure had dropped below that at which it originally opened, providing hysteresis.

These valves coincided with a change in firing behaviour. Instead of letting steam reach a feather at the valve, firemen (stokers) now tried to avoid noisy blowing off, especially at platforms or under the large roof of a major station. This was mostly at the behest of stationmasters, but also because firemen realised that any blowing off through a pop valve wasted boiler pressure. In one case, this was estimated at 20 psi (140 kPa) lost corresponding to the burning of 16 lb (7.3 kg) or more of shovelled coal. (Note: These figures are based on two measurements, a drop from 225 psi to 205 psi for an LNER Class V2 in 1952 and a smaller drop of 10 psi estimated in 1953 as 16 lbs of coal.)

Pop valves derived from Adams's patent design of 1873, with an extended lip. R. L. Ross's valves were patented in 1902 and 1904 and Coale's in 1906. They were more popular in America at first, but widespread from the 1920s on.

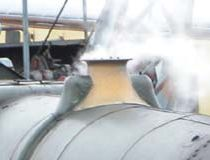
GWR safety valve cover

Although polished brass safety valve coverings had been an early feature of steam locomotives, the only railway to maintain this tradition after pop valves were introduced was the Great Western Railway, with their distinctive tapered brass safety valve bonnets and copper-capped chimneys.

=== Marine and Cockburn high-lift safety valves ===
Developments in high-pressure water-tube boilers for marine use placed more demands on safety valves. Valves of greater capacity were required, to vent safely the high steam-generating capacity of these large boilers. As the force on their valves increased, the issue of the spring's increasing stiffness as its load increased (like the Naylor valve) became more critical. The need to reduced valve feathering became even more important with high-pressure boilers, as this represented both a loss of distilled feedwater and also a scouring of the valve seats, leading to wear.

High-lift safety valves are direct-loaded spring types, although the spring does not bear directly on the valve, but on a guide-rod valve stem. The valve is beneath the base of the stem, the spring rests on a flange some height above this. The increased space between the valve itself and the spring seat allows the valve to lift higher, further clear of the seat. This gives a steam flow through the valve equivalent to a valve one and a half or twice as large (depending on detail design).

The Cockburn Improved High Lift design has similar features to the Ross pop type. The exhaust steam is partially trapped on its way out and acts on the base of the spring seat, increasing the lift force on the valve and holding the valve further open.

To optimise the flow through a given diameter of valve, the full-bore design is used. This has a servo action, where steam through a narrow control passage is allowed through if it passes a small control valve. This steam is then not exhausted, but is passed to a piston that is used to open the main valve.

There are safety valves known as PSV's and can be connected to pressure gauges (usually with a 1/2" BSP fitting). These allow a resistance of pressure to be applied to limit the pressure forced on the gauge tube, resulting in prevention of over pressurisation. the matter that has been injected into the gauge, if over pressurised, will be diverted through a pipe in the safety valve, and shall be driven away from the gauge.

== Types ==
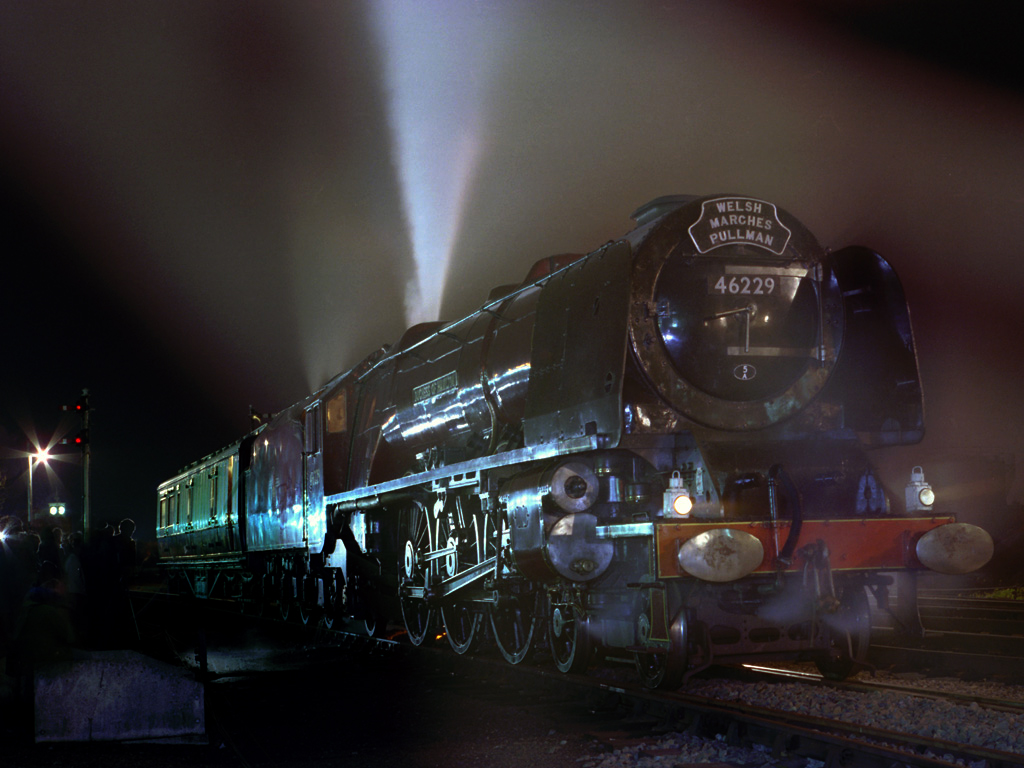
Steam locomotive No. 46229, Duchess of Hamilton lifts her boiler safety valve after hauling the Welsh Marches Pullman charter.

There is a wide range of safety valves having many different applications and performance criteria in different areas. In addition, national standards are set for many kinds of safety valves.

=== United States ===
- ASME (American Society of Mechanical Engineers) Boiler & Pressure Vessel Code, Section I
- ASME (American Society of Mechanical Engineers) Boiler & Pressure Vessel Code, Section VIII, Division 1
- API (American Petroleum Institute) Recommended Practice 520 and API Standard 526, API Standard 2000 (low pressure - Storage tank)

=== European Union ===
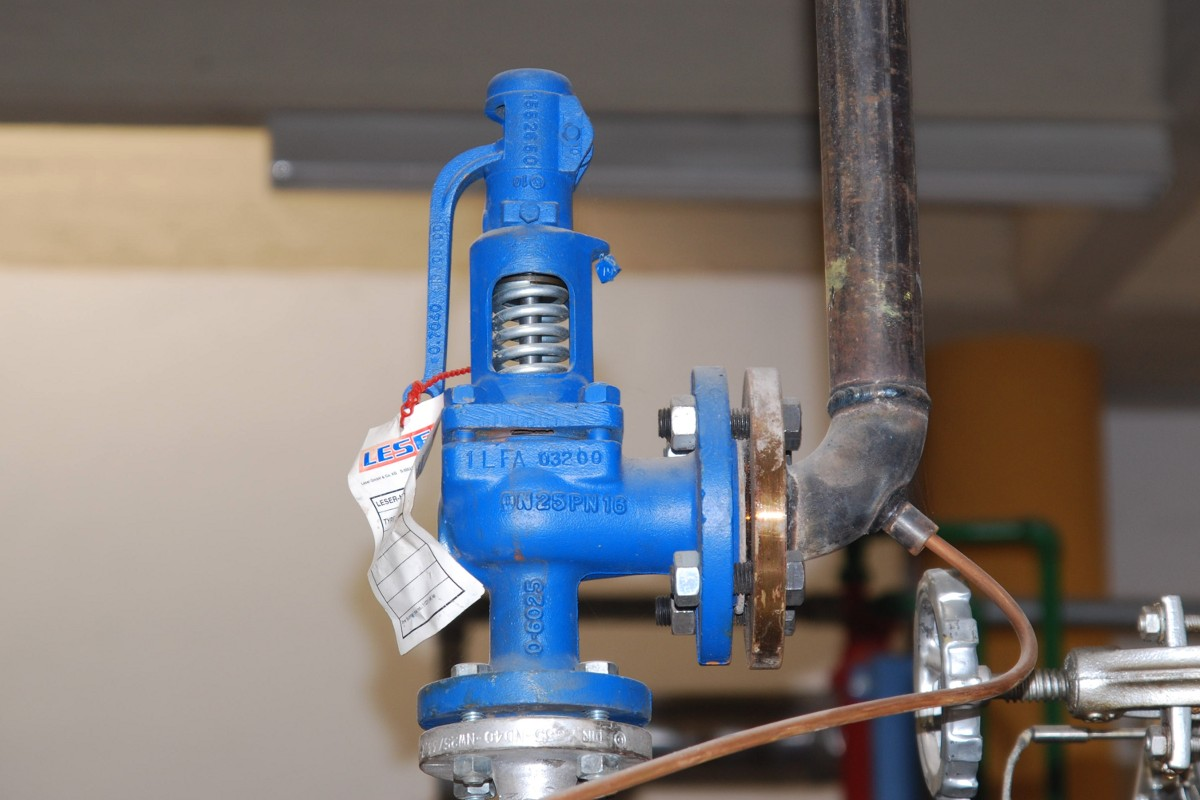
European standard steam boiler safety valve

- ISO 4126 (harmonized with European Union directives)
- EN 764-7 (former CEN standard, harmonized with European Union directives, replaced with EN ISO 4126-1)
- AD Merkblatt (German)
- PED 97/23/CE (Pressure Equipment Directive - European Union)

== Water heaters ==
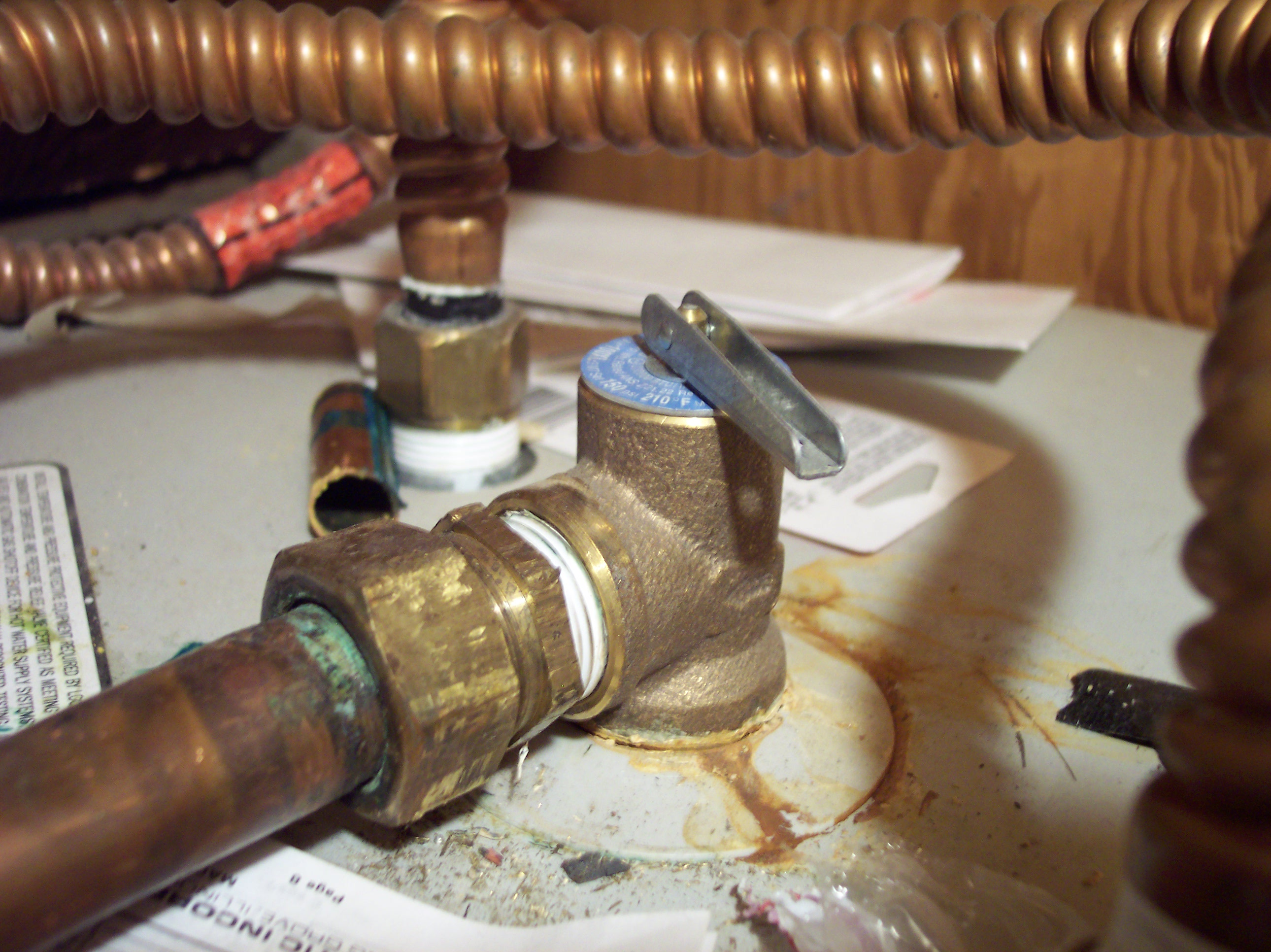
Pressure safety valve on a water heater

Safety valves are required on water heaters, where they prevent disaster in certain configurations in the event that a thermostat should fail. Such a valve is sometimes referred to as a "T&P valve" (Temperature and Pressure valve). There are still occasional, spectacular failures of older water heaters that lack this equipment. Houses can be leveled by the force of the blast.

== Pressure cookers ==
Pressure cookers are cooking pots with a pressure-proof lid. Cooking at pressure allows the temperature to rise above the normal boiling point of water (100 degrees Celsius at sea level), which speeds up the cooking and makes it more thorough.

Pressure cookers usually have two safety valves to prevent explosions. On older designs, one is a nozzle upon which a weight sits. The other is a sealed rubber grommet which is ejected in a controlled explosion if the first valve gets blocked. On newer generation pressure cookers, if the steam vent gets blocked, a safety spring will eject excess pressure and if that fails, the gasket will expand and release excess pressure downwards between the lid and the pan.

Newer generation pressure cookers have a safety interlock which locks the lid when internal pressure exceeds atmospheric pressure, to prevent accidents from a sudden release of very hot steam, food and liquid, which would happen if the lid were to be removed when the pan is still slightly pressurised inside (however, the lid will be very hard or impossible to open when the pot is still pressurised).

== See also ==
- Ball valve
- Butterfly valve
- Control valves
- Flow limiter
- Globe valve
- Needle valve
- Pilot-operated relief valve
- Relief valve
- Safety shutoff valve
- Shaft furnace breather
- Fusible plug
