= Chitenay =

- Commune
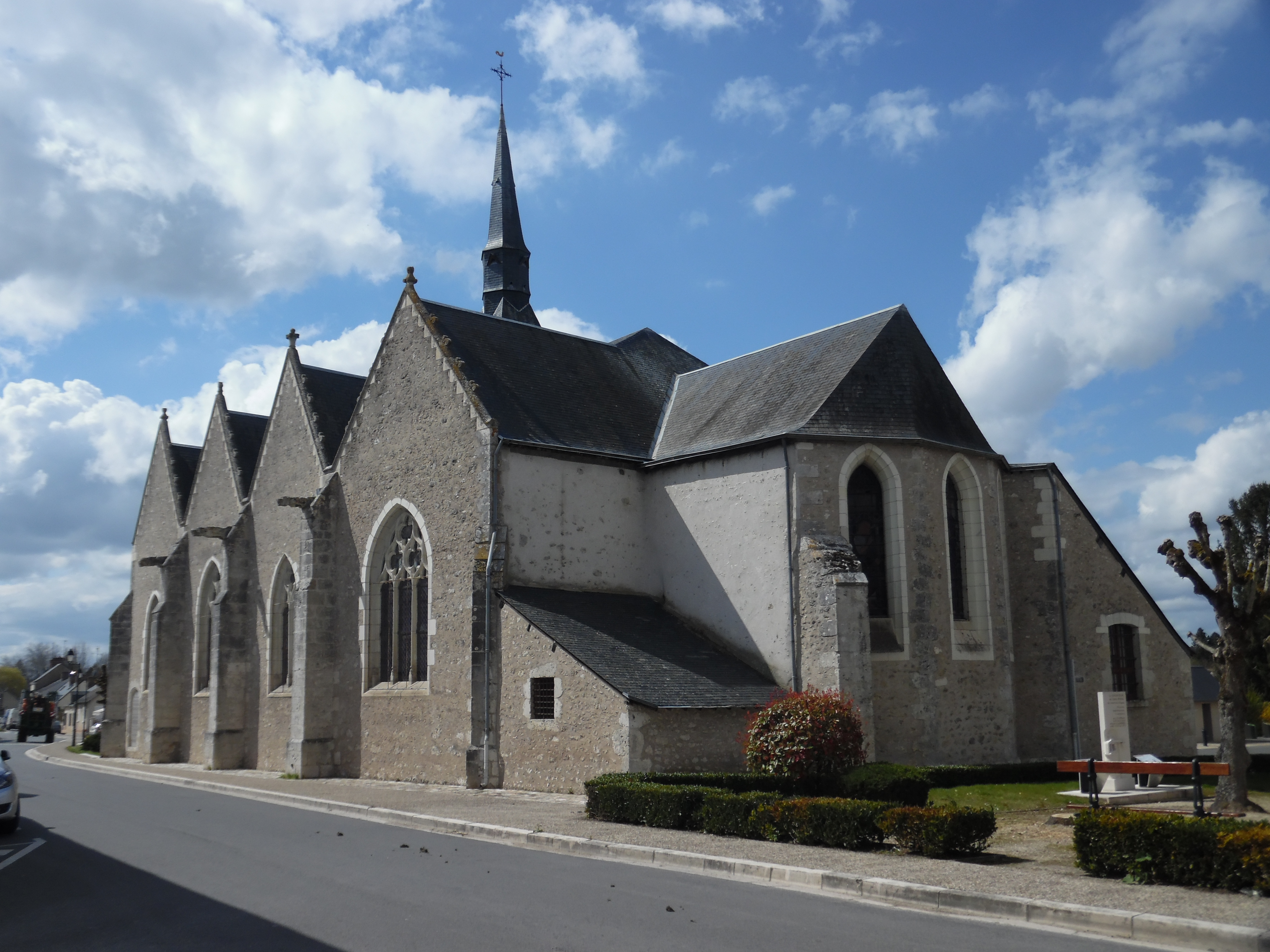
- Notre-Dame church

- Coat of arms
- Location of Chitenay
- Location within France Location within Centre-Val de Loire
- Coordinates: 47°29′53″N 1°22′18″E
- Country: France
- Region: Centre-Val de Loire
- Department: Loir-et-Cher
- Arrondissement: Blois
- Canton: Vineuil
- Intercommunality: CA Blois Agglopolys

Government
  - Mayor (2020–2026): Jean-Albert Boulay
- Area^{1}: 15.61 km^{2} (6.03 sq mi)
- Elevation: 90 m (300 ft)
- Highest elevation: 116 m (381 ft)
- Lowest elevation: 67 m (220 ft)
- Population (2023): 1,132
  - Density: 72.52/km^{2} (187.8/sq mi)
- Time zone: UTC+01:00 (CET)
  - Summer (DST): UTC+02:00 (CEST)
- INSEE/Postal code: 41052 /41120
- ^{1} French Land Register data, which excludes lakes, ponds, glaciers > 1 km^{2} (0.386 sq mi or 247 acres) and river estuaries.

Chitenay (French pronunciation: [ʃitnɛ]) is a commune in the Loir-et-Cher department of central France.

== Population ==
Historical population
Year	Pop.	±% p.a.
1968	655	—
1975	665	+0.22%
1982	777	+2.25%
1990	888	+1.68%
1999	921	+0.41%
2007	1,024	+1.33%
2012	1,037	+0.25%
2017	1,068	+0.59%
2023	1,132	+0.97%
Source: INSEE

== Personalities ==
- Denis Papin, physicist, mathematician, and inventor

== See also ==
- Communes of the Loir-et-Cher department
