= Pressure cooker =

Device for preparing food

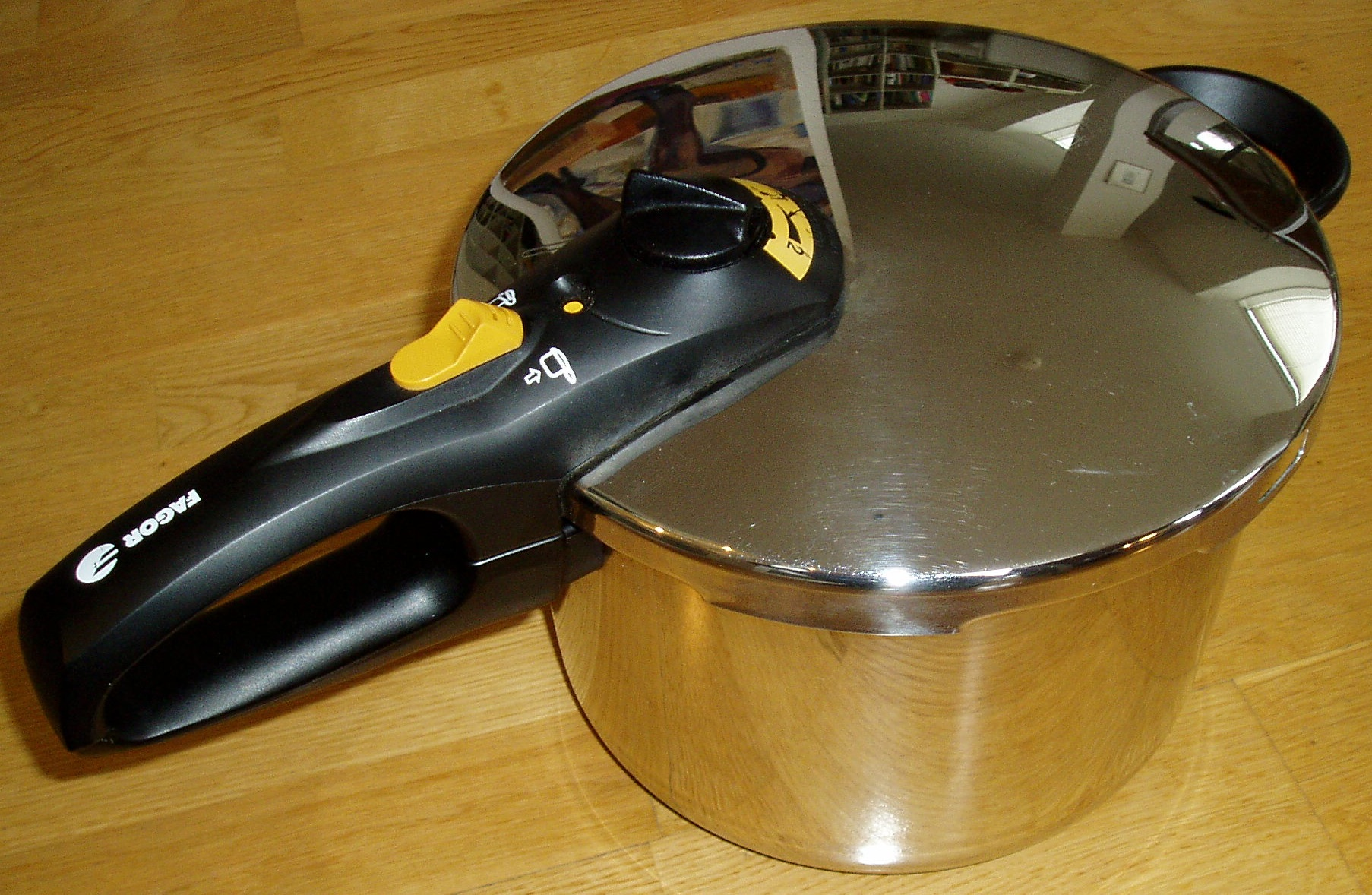
A stovetop pressure cooker

A pressure cooker is a sealed vessel used for cooking food with the use of high pressure steam and water or a water-based liquid, in a process called pressure cooking. The high pressure limits boiling and permits cooking at higher temperatures, allowing food to be cooked faster than at normal pressure.

The prototype of the modern pressure cooker was the steam digester invented in the seventeenth century by the physicist Denis Papin. It works by expelling air from the vessel and trapping steam produced from the boiling liquid. This is used to raise the internal pressure to one atmosphere above ambient and gives higher cooking temperatures between 100–121 °C (212–250 °F). Together with high thermal heat transfer from steam it permits cooking in between a half and a quarter the time of conventional boiling as well as saving considerable energy.

Almost any food that can be cooked in steam or water-based liquids can be cooked in a pressure cooker. Modern pressure cookers have many safety features to prevent the pressure cooker from reaching a pressure that could cause an explosion or other dangerous situations. After cooking, the steam pressure is lowered back to ambient atmospheric pressure so that the vessel can be opened. On all modern devices, a safety lock prevents opening while under pressure.

According to The New York Times Magazine, 37% of U.S. households owned at least one pressure cooker in 1950. By 2011, that rate dropped to only 20%. Part of the decline has been attributed to fear of explosion (although this is extremely rare with modern pressure cookers) along with competition from other fast cooking devices such as the microwave oven. However, third-generation pressure cookers have many more safety features and digital temperature control, do not vent steam during cooking, and are quieter and more efficient, and these conveniences have helped make pressure cooking more popular.

== History ==
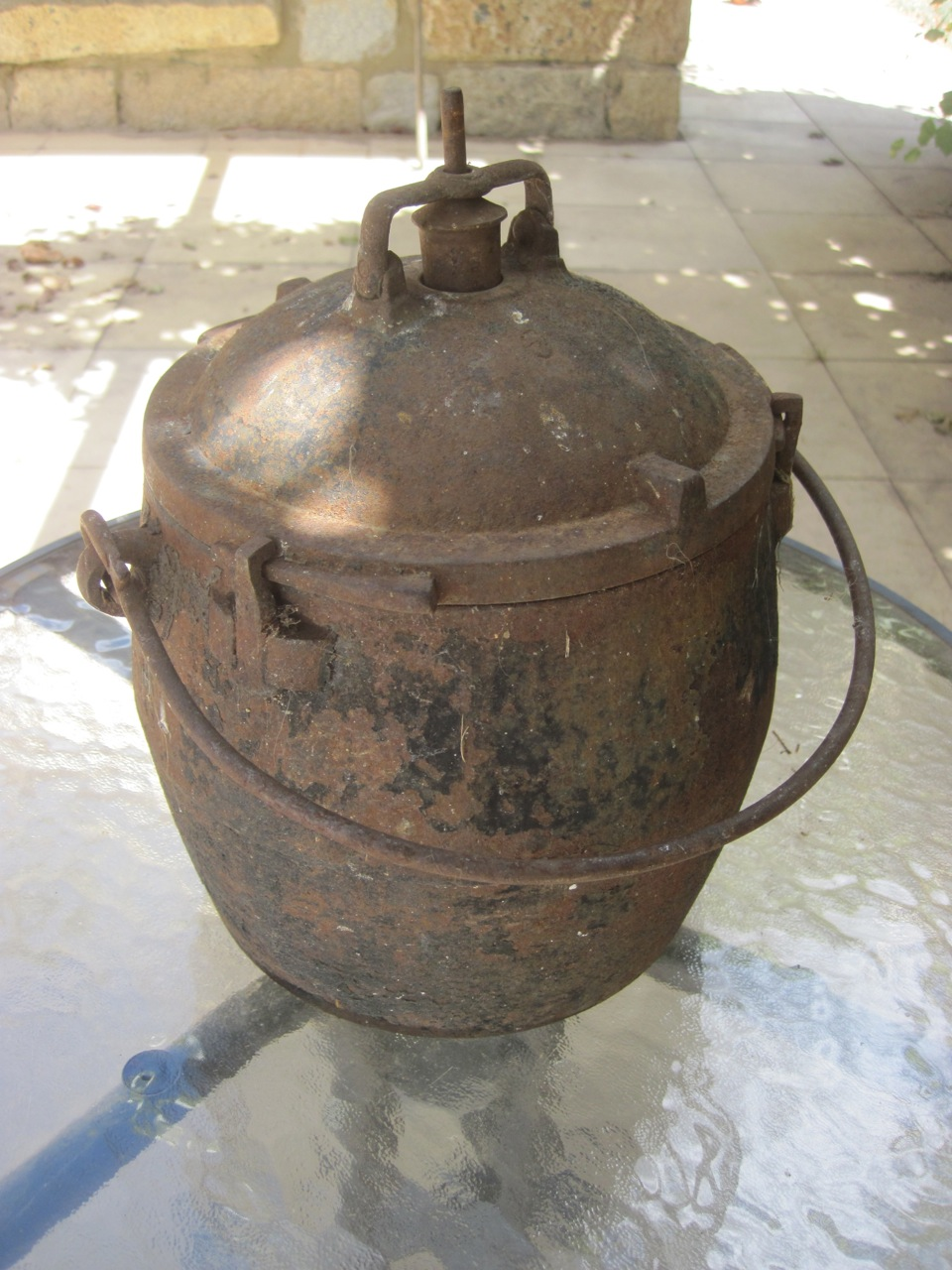
A six-quart pressure cooker manufactured by Archibald Kenrick & Sons in England, c. 1890

In 1679, French physicist Denis Papin, better known for his studies on steam, invented the steam digester in an attempt to reduce the cooking time of food. His airtight cooker used steam pressure to raise the water's boiling point, thus cooking food quicker. In 1681 Papin presented his invention to the Royal Society of London as a scientific study; he was later elected as a member.

In 1864, Georg Gutbrod of Stuttgart began manufacturing pressure cookers made of tinned cast iron.

Although people had experimented with cooking with pressurized steam for two centuries, the term "pressure cooker" was not commonly used until the early 20th century. The earliest citation of the phrase given in the Oxford English Dictionary is from a Lincoln, Nebraska, newspaper in 1914. However, the Dictionary editors apparently overlooked or did not have access to certain Colorado newspapers from a few years earlier than that. As early as 1910, the inventor Zeno E. Crook founded a business called "The Pressure Cooker Company" in Denver, Colorado. Crook had developed an aluminum cooker of a size practical for home use, and soon began marketing it to communities in the high country of Colorado, where the device proved to be well suited for use in high-altitude cooking. In many of these communities, Crook's pressure cooker was hailed as a marvelous new invention, until 1918, when Popular Science Monthly broke the news that this "invention" was actually more than 200 years old.

In 1918, Spain granted a patent for the pressure cooker to José Alix Martínez from Zaragoza. Martínez named it the olla exprés, literally "express cooking pot", under patent number 71143 in the Boletín Oficial de la Propiedad Industrial. In 1924, the first pressure cooking pot recipe book was published, written by José Alix and titled "360 fórmulas de cocina Para guisar con la 'olla expres'", or 360 recipes for cooking with a pressure cooker.

In 1935, the Automa pressure cooker was introduced. Mountaineers attempting to climb Mount Everest took it along with them to cook at higher altitudes.

In 1938, Alfred Vischer presented his invention, the Flex-Seal Speed Cooker, in New York City. Vischer's pressure cooker quickly gained popularity, and its success led to competition among American and European manufacturers. At the 1939 New York World's Fair, the National Pressure Cooker Company, later renamed National Presto Industries, introduced its own pressure cooker.

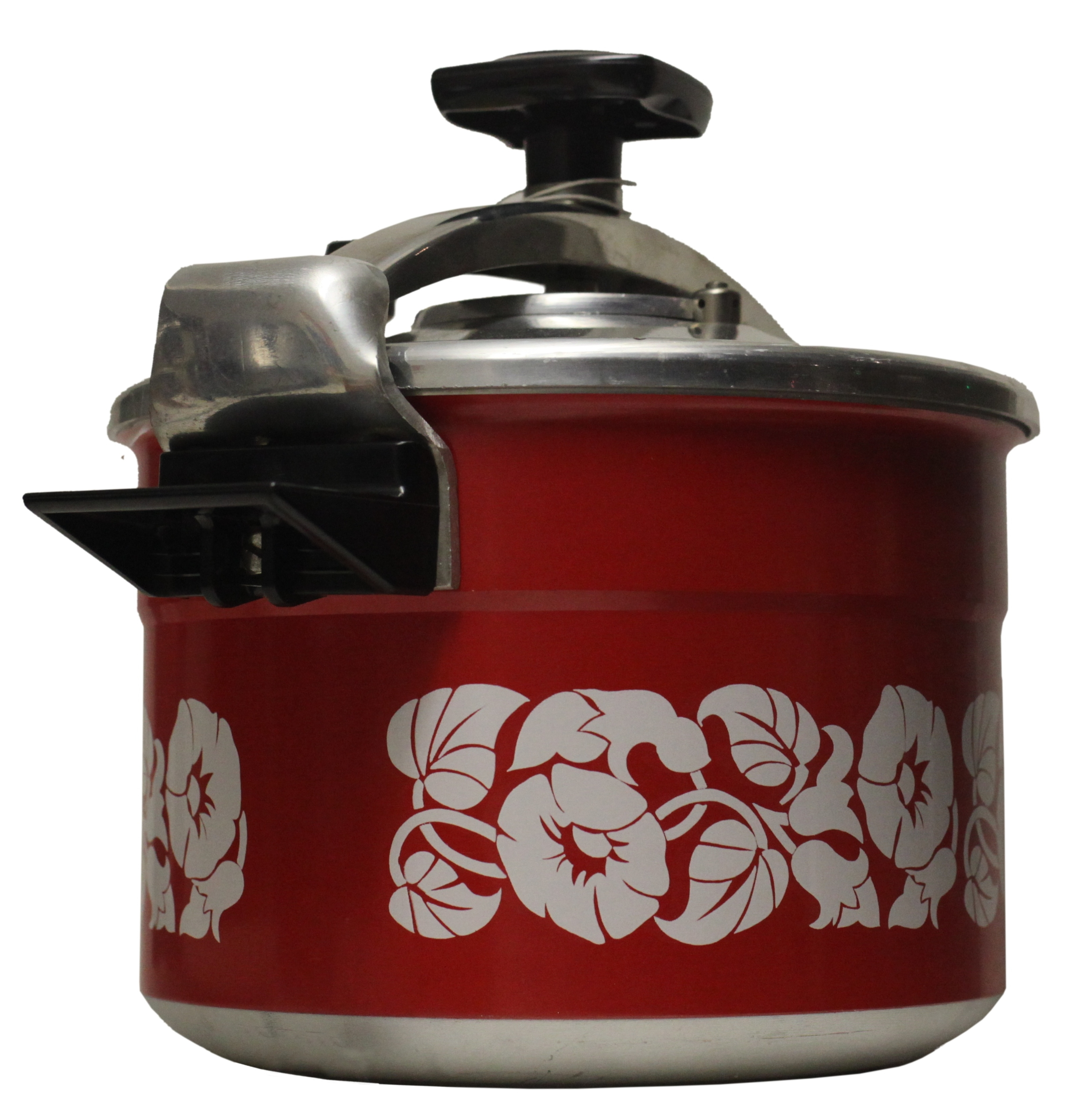
Super cocotte décor SEB, 1973. Aluminium body, polyamide lacquered with an embossed aluminium lid and a stainless steel stirrup. On display at the Musée gallo-romain de Fourvière, Lyon. 18/10.

=== First generation ===
Also known as "old type" pressure cookers, these operate with a weight-modified or "jiggler" valve, which releases pressure during operation. Some people consider them loud because the valve rattles as excess steam is released. Older pressure cookers typically offered only one pressure level, but from the 1960s onwards some allow the operator to change the weight of the valve, thus changing the pressure.

Today most pressure cookers are variations on the first-generation cookers, with the addition of new safety features such as a mechanism that prevents the cooker from being opened until it is entirely depressurized.

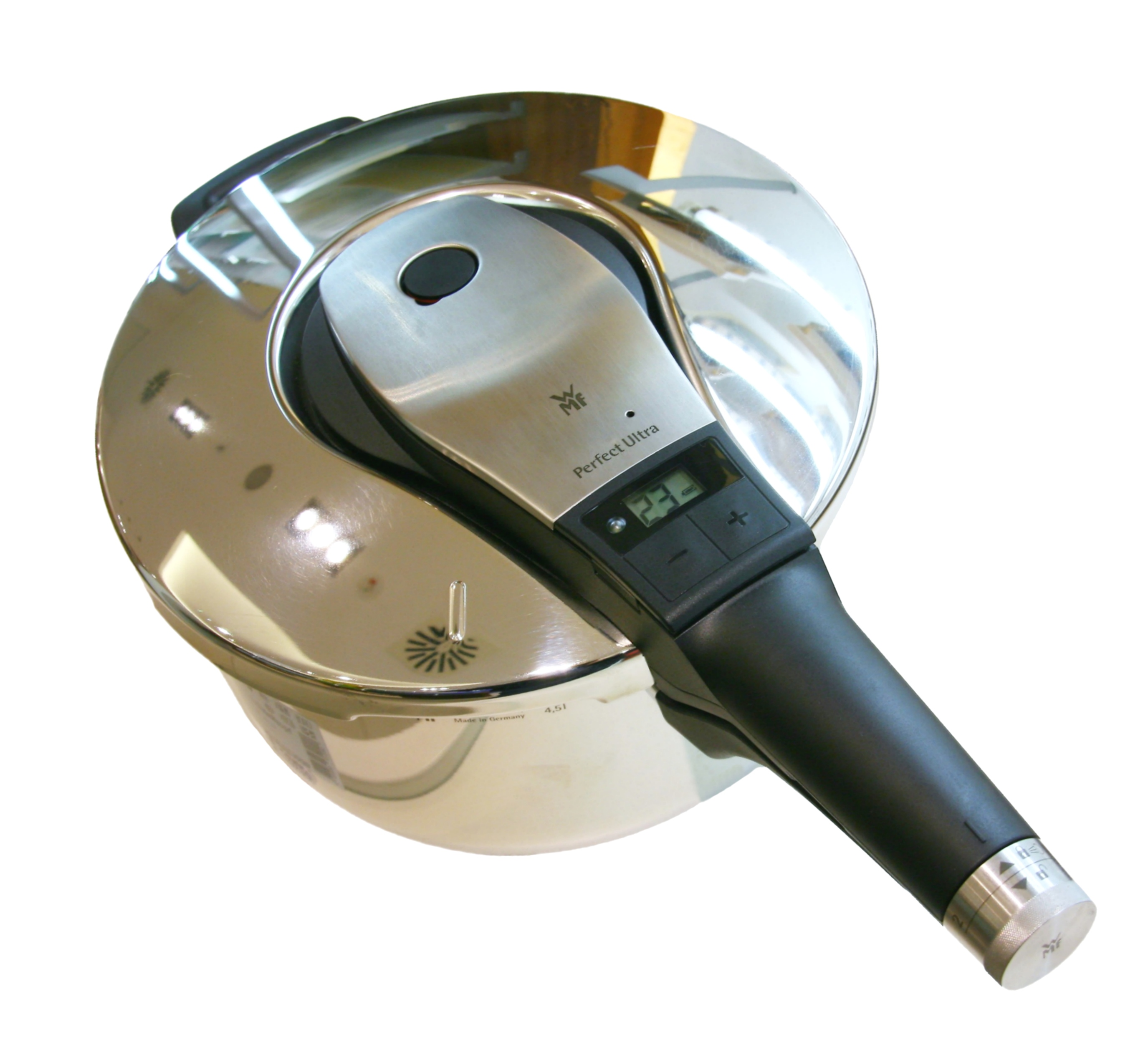
Second generation stove top pressure cooker with battery operated timer

=== Second generation ===
These operate with a spring-loaded valve that is often hidden from view in a proprietary mechanism. This generation is characterized by two or more pressure settings. Some of these pressure cookers do not release any steam during operation (non-venting) and instead use a rising indicator with markings to show the pressure level. These only release steam when the pan is opened, or as a safety precaution if the heat source is not reduced enough when the pan reaches the required cooking pressure. Others use a dial that the operator can advance by a few clicks (which alters the spring tension) to change the pressure setting or release pressure; these release steam during operation (venting).

=== Third generation "electric pressure cookers" ===
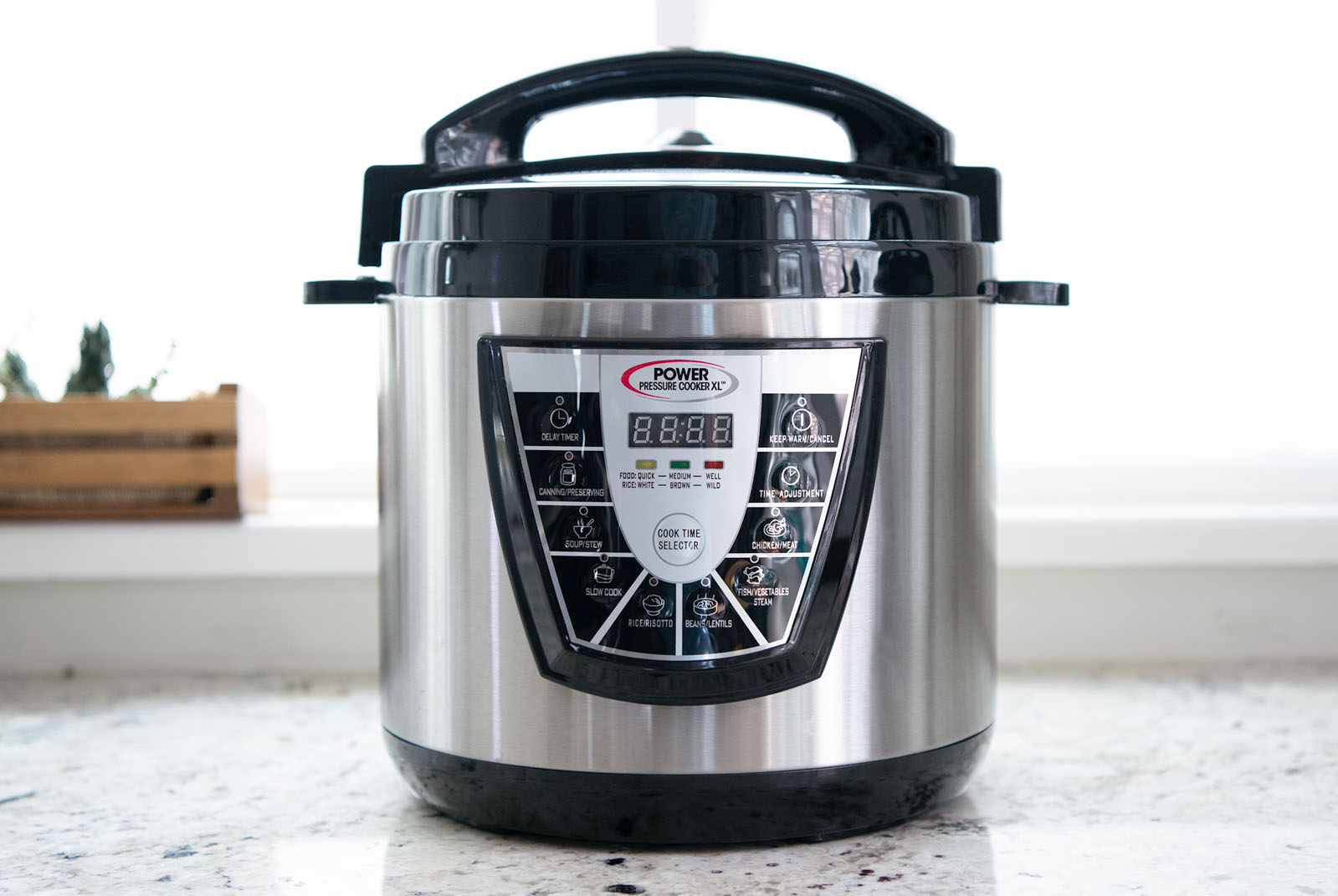
Instant Pot DUO pressure cooker is an example of a third generation pressure cooker and has digital control of the cooking time and heat

After the stove-top pressure cookers came the electric pressure cookers in 1991, called the "third generation" pressure cookers.

These include an electric heat source that is automatically regulated to maintain the operating temperature and pressure. They also include a spring-loaded valve (as described above) and are typically non venting during cooking.

An electric pressure cooker integrates a timer. Depending on cooking control capability, there are three generations of electric pressure cookers:

- First-generation electric, with mechanical timer. There is no delayed cooking capability.
- Second-generation electric, with digital controller. Delayed cooking becomes possible and the controller shows a countdown timer when working pressure is reached.
- Third-generation electric, with smart programming, which includes pre-set cooking times and settings based on heating intensity, temperature, pressure and duration.

Some pressure cookers are multifunctional (multicookers): pressure cooker, saute/browning, slow cooker, rice cooker, egg cooker, yogurt maker, steamer, sous vide, canner, and stockpot warmer that can also be used to keep cooked food warm. Since 2018, with the release of the Ninja Foodi pressure cooker, which was the first pressure cooker that could also air fry, several other pressure cooker manufacturers, including Instant Pot, have come out with their own pressure cookers that can air fry, which are now known as air fryer pressure cookers. Air fryer pressure cookers generally have two separate lids, one for pressure cooking, and one for air frying.

== Theory ==
Pressure cooker pressures and temperatures
Gauge Pressure (rel. to sea level)	Temp.	Approximate Cooking time versus boiling (Note: Based on the chemistry rule-of-thumb that reaction rates double for every 10 °C (18 °F) increase in temperature.)
0 bar (0 psi)	100 °C (212 °F)	100%
0.1 bar (1.5 psi)	103 °C (217 °F)	80%
0.2 bar (2.9 psi)	105 °C (221 °F)	70%
0.3 bar (4.4 psi)	107 °C (225 °F)	61%
0.4 bar (5.8 psi)	110 °C (230 °F)	50%
0.5 bar (7.3 psi)	112 °C (234 °F)	43%
0.6 bar (8.7 psi)	114 °C (237 °F)	38%
0.7 bar (10 psi)	116 °C (241 °F)	33%
0.8 bar (12 psi)	117 °C (243 °F)	31%
0.9 bar (13 psi)	119 °C (246 °F)	27%
1.0 bar (15 psi)	121 °C (250 °F)	23%

The approximate vapor pressure of water as a function of temperature, or when viewed sideways, the boiling point of water as a function of pressure.

At standard pressure the boiling point of water is 100 °C (212 °F). With any food containing or cooked with water, once the temperature reaches the boiling point, any excess heat causes some of the water to vaporize into steam efficiently carrying away heat keeping the food temperature at 100 °C.

In a sealed pressure cooker, as the water boils, the steam is trapped in the cooker which raises the pressure. However, the boiling point of water increases with pressure resulting in superheated water.

The equation for the pressure, temperature and volume of the steam is given by the ideal gas law:

$$PV = nRT$$
or
$$T = PV/nR$$
where $P$, $V$ and $T$ are the pressure, volume and temperature; $n$ is the amount of substance; and $R$ is the ideal gas constant.

In a sealed pressure cooker the volume and amount of steam is fixed, so the temperature can be controlled either directly or by setting the pressure, such as with a pressure release valve. For example, if the pressure reaches 1 bar or 100 kPa (15 psi) above the existing atmospheric pressure, the water will have reached a temperature of approximately 120 °C (248 °F) which cooks the food much faster.

Pressure cookers also use steam and water to rapidly transfer the heat to the food and all parts of the vessel. While a temperature of 120 °C is not particularly high compared to cooking temperatures in an oven, ovens contain air which is subject to thermal boundary layer effects which greatly slows heating, whereas pressure cookers flush air from the cooking vessel during warm up and replace it with hot steam. For items not placed within the liquid, as this steam condenses on the food it transfers water's latent heat of vaporization, which is extremely large (2.275 kJ/g), to the surface, rapidly bringing the surface of the food up to cooking temperature. Because the steam condenses and drips away, no significant boundary layer forms and heat transfer is exceptionally efficient, and food heats much faster and more evenly.

However some recipes require browning to develop flavors as during roasting or frying. Higher temperatures are attainable with conventional cooking where the surface of the food can dry out. Such browning occurs via the Maillard reaction, at temperatures higher than the roughly 120 °C (248 °F) achieved in pressure cooking. Because those temperatures are not reached in pressure cooking, foods are generally browned by searing them, either in the open pressure cooker or another pan beforehand.

=== High altitudes ===
A pressure cooker can be used to compensate for lower atmospheric pressure at high elevations. The boiling point of water drops by approximately 1 °C per every 294 metres of altitude (see: High-altitude cooking), causing the boiling point of water to be significantly below the 100 °C (212 °F) at standard pressure. This is problematic because temperatures above roughly 90 °C are necessary to cook many common vegetables in a reasonable time. For example, on the summit of Everest (8,848 m (29,029 ft)), the boiling point of water would be only 70 °C (158 °F). Without the use of a pressure cooker, many boiled foods may remain undercooked, as described in Charles Darwin's The Voyage of the Beagle (chapter XV, March 20, 1835):

Having crossed the Peuquenes [Piuquenes], we descended into a mountainous country, intermediate between the two main ranges, and then took up our quarters for the night. We were now in the republic of Mendoza. The elevation was probably not under 11,000 feet (3,400 m) [...]. At the place where we slept water necessarily boiled, from the diminished pressure of the atmosphere, at a lower temperature than it does in a less lofty country; the case being the converse of that of a Papin's digester. Hence the potatoes, after remaining for some hours in the boiling water, were nearly as hard as ever. The pot was left on the fire all night, and next morning it was boiled again, but yet the potatoes were not cooked.

When pressure cooking at high altitudes, cooking times need to be increased by approximately 5% for every 300 m (980 ft) above 610 m (2,000 ft) elevation. Since the regulators work off the pressure differential between interior and ambient pressure, the absolute pressure in the interior of a pressure cooker will always be lower at higher altitudes.

Weight is a concern with backpackers, so mountaineering pressure cookers are designed to operate at a lower differential pressure than stove-top units. This enables them to use thinner, and therefore lighter materials. Generally, the goal is to raise the cooking temperature enough to make cooking possible and to conserve fuel by reducing heat lost through boiling. Lightweight pressure cookers as small as 1.5 litres (0.40 US gal) weighing 1.28 kilograms (2.8 lb) are available for mountain climbers. Sherpas often use pressure cookers in base camp.

=== Health benefits ===
Some food toxins can be reduced by pressure cooking. A Korean study of aflatoxins in rice (associated with Aspergillus fungus) showed that pressure cooking was capable of reducing aflatoxin concentrations to 32% of the amount in the uncooked rice, compared to 77% from ordinary cooking.

== Design ==
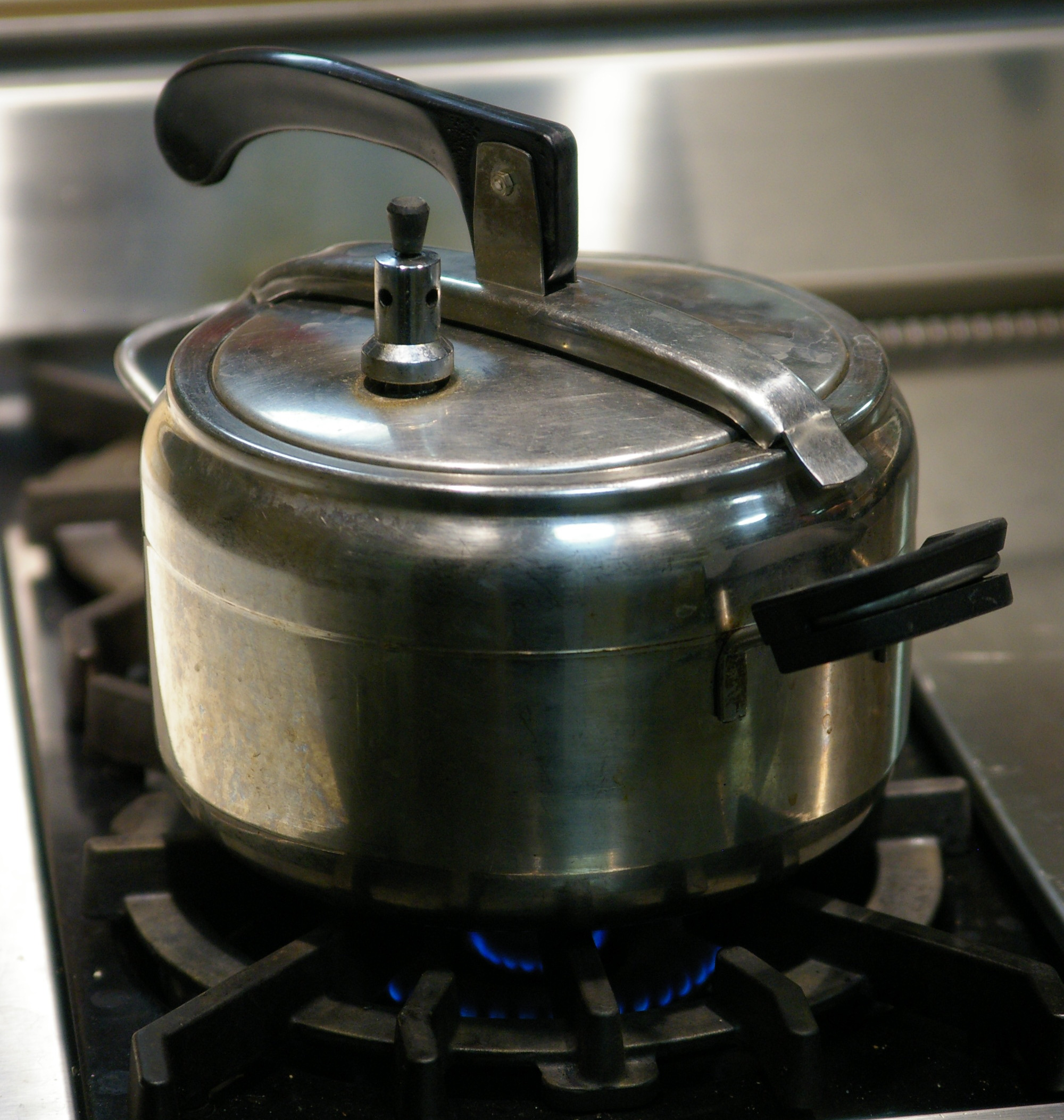
The regulator in this pressure cooker is a weight on a nozzle next to the handle on the lid.

Pressure cookers employ one or more regulators to control the pressure/temperature. All types have a calibrated pressure relief valve, as well as one or more emergency valves.

With the simplest types, once the desired pressure is reached, the valve opens, and steam escapes cooling the vessel and limiting the temperature. More advanced stovetop models have pressure indicators that permit the user to adjust the heat to prevent the steam from escaping. Third generation types automatically measure the state of the vessel and control the power so as to not release steam in operation.

=== Capacity ===
Pressure cookers are available in different capacities for cooking larger or smaller amounts, with 6 litres' capacity being common. The maximum capacity of food is less than the advertised capacity because pressure cookers can only be filled up to 2/3 full, depending on ingredients and liquid (see Safety features section).

=== Pan ===
- Metal pan body
- Pan handles, usually one each on opposite ends, for carrying the cooker with both hands

Because of the forces that pressure cookers must withstand, they are usually heavier than conventional pots of similar size. The increased weight of conventional pressure cookers makes them unsuitable for applications in which saving weight is a priority, such as camping. Nonetheless, small, lightweight pressure cookers are available for mountain climbers (see High altitudes).

=== Lid ===
Lids usually have a number of features:

- Lid handle, usually with a locking device button or slider that "clicks" shut and prevents removal while cooking
- Gasket (also known as a "sealing ring") that seals the cooker airtight
- Steam vent with a pressure regulator on top (either a weight or spring device) that maintains the pressure level in the pan
- Pressure indicator pin, for showing the presence or absence of any pressure, however slight
- Safety devices on the lid (typically over-pressure and/or over-temperature pressure release valves)

=== Gasket ===
A gasket or sealing ring, made from either rubber or silicone, forms a gas-tight seal that does not allow air or steam to escape between the lid and pan. Normally, the only way steam can escape is through a regulator on the lid while the cooker is pressurized. If the regulator becomes blocked, a safety valve provides a backup escape route for steam.

To seal the gasket there are several main methods used. Each determines the design of the pressure cooker:

- The twist-on design has slots on the lid engaging with flanges on the body, similar to a lid on a glass jar, that works by placing the lid on the pot and twisting it about 30° to lock it in place. A common modern design, it has easily implemented locking features that prevent the removal of the lid while under pressure.
- The center screw design has a bar that is slotted in place over the lid and a screw tightened downward to hold the lid on. Though an older design, it is still produced due to its ease of construction and simplicity.
- The bolt-down design has flanges on both its lid and its body for bolts to be passed through, and usually uses wingnuts that hinge on the body and so are never fully removed from the cooker; this sealing design is typically used for larger units such as canning retorts and autoclaves. It is very simple to produce, and it can seal with simple and inexpensive gaskets.
- The internally fitted lid design employs an oval lid that is placed inside and presses outward; the user inserts the lid at an angle, then turns the lid to align it with the pot opening on top because the lid is larger than the opening. A spring arrangement holds the lid in place until the pressure forms and holds the lid tightly against the body, preventing removal until the pressure is released.

Gaskets (sealing rings) require special care when cleaning (e.g., not washed with kitchen knives), unlike a standard lid for a saucepan. Food debris, fats, and oils must be cleaned from the gasket after every use. Gasket/sealing rings need replacing with a new one about once a year (or sooner if it is damaged e.g. a small split). A very dry gasket can make it difficult or impossible to close the lid. Smearing the gasket sparingly with vegetable oil alleviates this problem (using too much vegetable oil can make the gasket swell and prevent it sealing properly). A gasket that has lost its flexibility makes bringing the cooker up to pressure difficult as steam can escape before sufficient pressure is generated to provide an adequate seal; this is usually a sign that the gasket needs replacing with a new one. Oiling the gasket with vegetable oil may alleviate the problem temporarily, but a new gasket is often required.

Pressure cooker manufacturers sell replacement gaskets and recommend their replacement at regular intervals e.g. annually. If the pressure cooker has not been used for a long time, the gasket and other rubber or silicone parts will dry out and will likely need replacing.

=== Safety features ===
Early pressure cookers equipped with only a primary safety valve risked explosion from food blocking the release valve. On modern pressure cookers, food residues blocking the steam vent or the liquid boiling dry will trigger additional safety devices. Modern pressure cookers sold from reputable manufacturers have sufficient safety features to prevent the pressure cooker itself from exploding. When excess pressure is released by a safety mechanism, debris of food being cooked may also be ejected with the steam, which is loud and forceful. This can be avoided if the pressure cooker is regularly cleaned and maintained in accordance with the manufacturer's instructions and never overfilled with food and/or liquid.

Modern pressure cookers typically have two or three redundant safety valves and additional safety features, such as an interlock lid that prevents the user from opening the lid when the internal pressure exceeds atmospheric pressure, preventing accidents from a sudden release of hot liquid, steam and food. If safety mechanisms are not correctly in place, the cooker will not pressurize the contents. Pressure cooker failure is dangerous: a large quantity of scalding steam and water will be forcefully ejected and if the lid separates it may be propelled with considerable force. Some cookers with an internally fitted lid may be particularly dangerous upon failure as the lid fits tighter with increasing pressure, preventing the lid from deforming and venting around the edges. Due to these dangers pressure cookers are generally over-engineered in a safety regard and some countries even have regulations to prevent the sale of non-compliant cookers.

For first generation pressure cookers with a weighted valve or "jiggler", the primary safety valve or regulator is usually a weighted stopper, commonly called "the rocker" or "vent weight". This weighted stopper is lifted by the steam pressure, allowing excess pressure to be released. There is a backup pressure release mechanism that releases pressure quickly if the primary pressure release mechanism fails (e.g., food jams the steam discharge path). One such method is a hole in the lid that is blocked by a low melting point alloy plug and another is a rubber grommet with a metal insert at the center. At a sufficiently high pressure, the grommet will distort and the insert will blow out of its mounting hole to release pressure. If the pressure continues to increase, the grommet itself will blow out to release pressure. These safety devices usually require replacement when activated by excess pressure. Newer pressure cookers may have a self-resettable spring device, fixed onto the lid, that releases excess pressure.

On second generation pressure cookers, a common safety feature is the gasket, which expands to release excess pressure downward between the lid and the pot. This release of excess pressure is forceful and sufficient to extinguish the flame of a gas stove.

Pressure cookers sold in the European Union (EU) must comply with the Pressure Equipment Directive.

==== Maximum fill levels ====
The recommended maximum fill levels of food/liquid avoids blockage of the steam valve or developing excess pressure: two-thirds full with solid food, half full for liquids and foods that foam and froth (e.g., rice, pasta; adding a tablespoon of cooking oil minimizes foaming), and no more than one-third full for pulses (e.g., lentils).

=== Accessories ===
- Steamer basket
- Trivet for keeping the steamer basket above liquid
- Metal divider, for separating different foods in the steamer basket e.g. vegetables
- Inner pot, for pot-in-pot pressure steaming

=== Materials ===
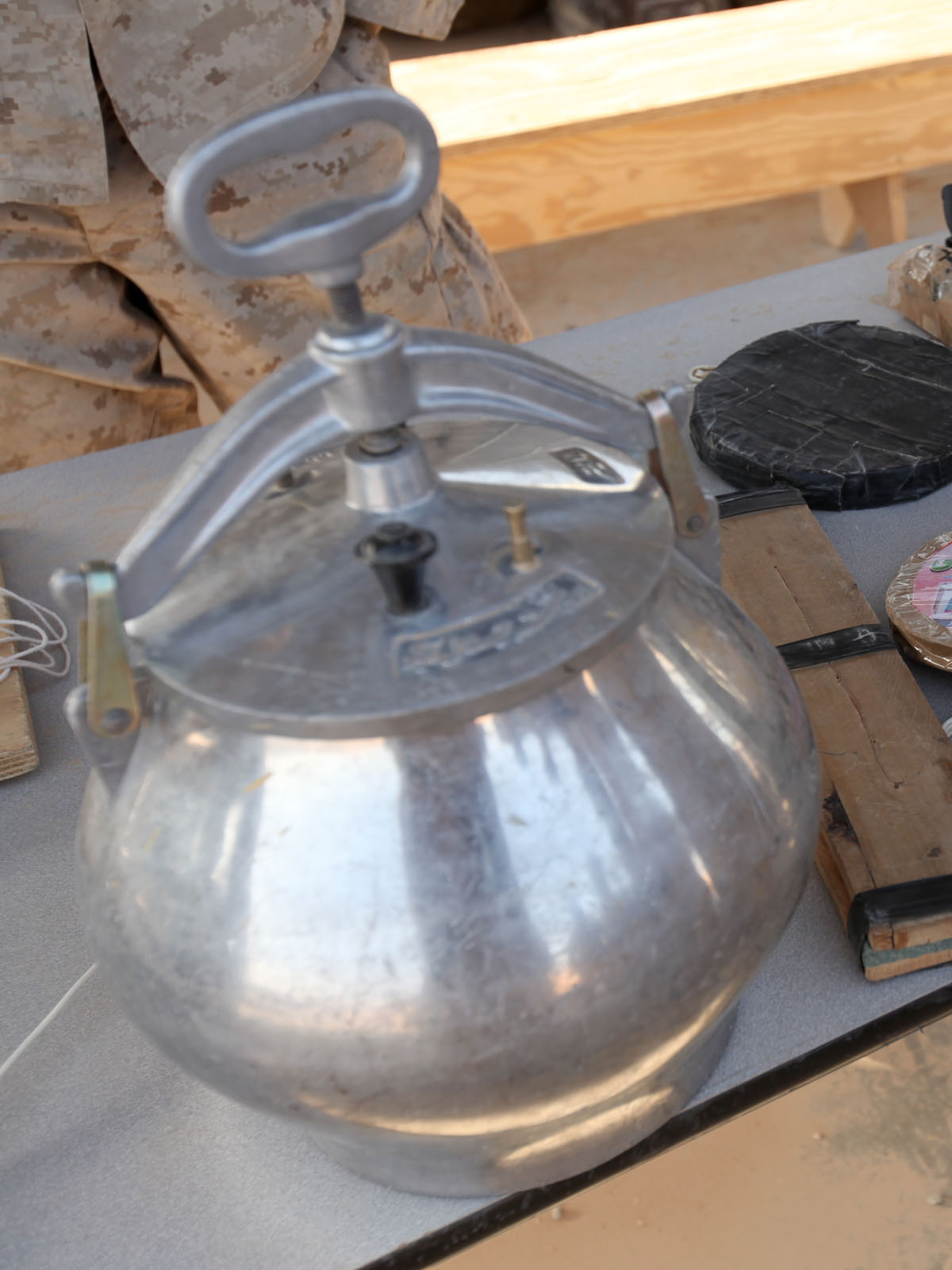
Aluminum Afghani pressure cooker (kazan), similar to those found to contain high levels of lead.

Pressure cookers are typically made of aluminum (aluminium) or stainless steel. Aluminum pressure cookers may be stamped, polished, or anodized, but all are unsuitable for the dishwasher. They are cheaper, but the aluminum is reactive to acidic foods, whose flavors are changed in the reactions, and are less durable than stainless steel pressure cookers. Some aluminum pressure cookers from Afghanistan are known to be contaminated with lead and imported pots were responsible for the lead poisoning of Afghani refugees in Washington state in 2019.

Higher-quality stainless steel pressure cookers are made with heavy, three-layer, or copper-clad bottoms (heat spreader) for uniform heating because stainless steel has lower thermal conductivity. Most modern stainless steel cookers are dishwasher safe, although some manufacturers may recommend washing by hand. Some pressure cookers have a non-stick interior.

== Risks ==
Between 2003 and 2019, 759 injuries from pressure cookers were recorded in the US "National Electronic Injury Surveillance System", leading to an estimate of about 1700 emergency room level injuries nationally per year. Analysis of 57 injuries in Turkey showed 95% of the cases were caused by improper use of the device, suggesting the need for additional safety features. Over 900,000 pressure cookers were recalled when it was discovered that the lid can detach when the device is pressurized. Lawsuits against pressure cooker manufacturers have alleged failures in device design.

== Operation ==
=== Liquid ===
Pressure cooking always requires a water-based liquid to generate the steam to raise the pressure within the cooker. Pressure cooking cannot be used for cooking methods that produce little steam such as roasting, pan frying, or deep frying. A minimum quantity of liquid is required to create and maintain pressure, as indicated in the manufacturer's instruction manual. For venting cookers more liquid is required for longer cooking times. This is not desirable for food requiring much less liquid, but recipes and books for pressure cookers take this into account.

=== Assembling ===
Food is placed inside the pressure cooker with a small amount of water or other liquid such as stock. Food is either cooked in the liquid or above the liquid for steaming; the latter method prevents the transfer of flavors from the liquid.

Sauces which contain starch thickeners can tend to burn onto the interior base of the pressure cooker which may prevent the cooker from reaching operating pressure. Because of this issue, sauces may require thickening or reduction after pressure cooking.

With pot in pot pressure cooking, some or all of the food is placed in an elevated pot on a trivet above water or another food item which generates the steam. This permits the cooking of multiple foods separately, and allows for minimal water mixed with the food, and thicker sauces, which would otherwise scorch onto the bottom of the pan.

=== Bringing to pressure ===
The lid is closed, the pressure setting is chosen and the pressure cooker is heated to boil the liquid. The cooker fills with steam and vents air. As the internal temperature rises, the pressure rises until it reaches the desired gauge pressure.

It usually takes several minutes for the pressure cooker to reach the selected pressure level. It can take 10 minutes or longer depending on the quantity of food, the temperature of the food (cold or frozen food delays pressurization), the amount of liquid, the power of the heat source, and the size of the pressure cooker. There is typically a pop-up indicator that shows that the cooker has pressure inside, but it does not reliably signal that the cooker has reached the selected pressure. The pop-up indicator shows the state of the interlock which prevents the lid from being opened while there is any internal pressure. Manufacturers may use their own terminology for this, such as calling it a "locking indicator."

Timing the recipe begins when the selected pressure/pressure is reached. Once the cooker reaches full pressure, the heat is lowered to maintain the pressure. With pressure cookers accurate timing is essential using an audible timer.

With first generation designs, the pressure regulator weight begins levitating above its nozzle, allowing excess steam to escape. In second generation pressure cookers, either a relief valve subsequently opens, releasing steam to prevent the pressure from rising any further or a rod rises with markers to indicate the pressure level, without constantly venting steam. At this stage, the heat source is reduced to the lowest possible heat that still maintains pressure, as extra heat wastes energy and increases liquid loss. In third generation pressure cookers, the device will detect the vessel has reached the required cooking temperature/pressure and will maintain it for the programmed time, generally without further loss of steam.

Recipes for foods using raising agents such as steamed puddings call for gentle pre-steaming, without pressure, in order to activate the raising agents prior to cooking and achieve a light, fluffy texture.

=== Food containers ===
Small containers such as plastic pudding containers can be used in a pressure cooker, if the containers (and any covering used) can withstand temperatures of 130 °C (266 °F) and are not placed directly on the interior base. The containers can be used for cooking foods that are prone to burning on the base of the pressure cooker. A lid for the container may be used if the lid allows some steam to come into contact with the food and the lid is securely fitted; an example is foil or greaseproof paper, pleated in the center and tied securely with string. Containers that are cracked or have otherwise sustained damage are not suitable. Cooking time is longer when using covered containers because the food is not in direct contact with the steam. Since non-metal containers are poorer heat conductors, the type of container material stated in the recipe cannot be substituted without affecting the outcome. For example, if the recipe time is calculated using a stainless steel container and a plastic container is used instead, the recipe will be undercooked, unless the cooking time is increased. Containers with thicker sides, e.g., oven-proof glass or ceramic containers, which are slower to conduct heat, will add about 10 minutes to the cooking time. Liquid can be added inside the container when pressure cooking foods such as rice, which need to absorb liquid in order to cook properly.

=== Pre-frying ingredients ===
The flavor of some foods, such as meat and onions, can be improved by gently cooking with a little pre-heated cooking oil, butter or other fat in the open pressure cooker over medium heat for stove-top models (unless the manufacturer advises against this) before pressure cooking, while avoiding overheating the empty pressure cooker not heating the empty cooker with the lid and gasket in place to avoid damage. Electric pressure cookers usually have a "saute" or "brown" option for frying ingredients. The pressure cooker needs to cool briefly before adding liquid; otherwise some of the liquid will evaporate instantly, possibly leaving insufficient liquid for the entire pressure cooking time; if deglazing the pan, more liquid may need to be added.

=== Pressure release methods ===
After cooking, there are three ways of releasing the pressure, either quickly or slowly, before the lid can be opened. Recipes for pressure cookers state which release method is required at the end of the cooking time for proper results. Failure to follow the recommendation may result in food that is under-cooked or over-cooked.

To avoid opening the pressure cooker too often while cooking different vegetables with varying cooking times, the vegetables that take longer to cook can be cut into smaller pieces and vegetables that cook faster can be cut into larger pieces.

To inspect the food, the pressure cooker needs to be opened, which halts the cooking process. With a conventional saucepan, this can be done in a matter of seconds by visually inspecting the food.

==== Manual, normal, regular, or automatic release ====
This method is sometimes called a quick release, not to be confused with the cold water release (mentioned below). It involves the quick release of vapor by gradually lifting (or removing) the valve, pushing a button, or turning a dial. It is most suitable to interrupt cooking to add food that cooks faster than what is already in the cooker. For example, since meat takes longer to cook than vegetables, it is necessary to add vegetables to stew later so that it will cook only for the last few minutes. Releasing the steam with care avoids the risk of being scalded by the rapid release of hot steam. This release method is not suitable for foods that foam and froth while cooking; the hot contents might spray outwards due to the pressure released from the steam vent. Pressure cookers should be operated with caution when releasing vapour through the valve, especially while cooking foamy foods and liquids (lentils, beans, grains, milk, gravy, etc.) This release method takes about two minutes to release the pressure before the lid can be opened.

==== Natural release ====
The natural release method allows the pressure to drop slowly. This is achieved by removing the pressure cooker from the heat source and allowing the pressure to lower without action. It takes approximately 10 to 15 minutes (possibly longer) for the pressure to disappear before the lid can be opened. On many pressure cookers, a coloured indicator pin will drop when the pressure has gone. This natural release method is recommended for foods that foam and froth during cooking, such as rice, legumes, or recipes with raising agents such as steamed puddings. The texture and tenderness of meat cooked in a pressure cooker can be improved by using the natural release method. The natural release method finishes cooking foods or recipes that have longer cooking times because the inside of the pressure cooker stays hot. This method is not recommended for foods that require very short cooking times, otherwise the food overcooks.

==== Cold water quick release ====
This method is the fastest way of releasing pressure with portable pressure cookers, but can be dangerous if performed incorrectly. Hence it is safer to release pressure by using the other methods. The manufacturer's instruction book may advise against the cold water release or require it to be performed differently.

The cold water release method involves using slow running cold tap water, over the edge of the pressure cooker lid, being careful to avoid the steam vent or any other valves or outlets, and never immersing the pressure cooker under water, otherwise steam can be ejected from under the lid, which could cause scalding injury to the user; also the pressure cooker lid can be permanently damaged by an internal vacuum if water gets sucked into the pressure cooker, since the incoming water blocks the inrush of air.

The cold water release is most suitable for foods with short cooking times. It takes about 20 seconds for the cooker to cool down enough to lower the pressure so that it can be safely opened. This method is not suitable for electric pressure cookers, as they are not immersible. This type of pressure cooker cannot be opened with a cold water quick-release method.

The cold water release method is not recommended when cooking pulses e.g. red kidney beans, as the sudden release of pressure can cause the bean to burst its skin.

=== Pressure settings ===
Most pressure cookers have a cooking (operating) pressure setting between 0.8–1 bar (11.6–15 psi) (gauge) so the pressure cooker operates at 1.8 to 2.0 bar (absolute). The standard cooking pressure of 15 psi gauge was determined by the United States Department of Agriculture in 1917. At this pressure, water boils at 121 °C (250 °F) (described in vapour pressure of water article).

The higher temperature causes food to cook faster; cooking times can typically be reduced to one-third of the time for conventional cooking methods. The actual cooking time also depends on the pressure release method used after timing (see Pressure release methods for details) and the thickness and density of the food, since thicker (and denser) foods take longer to cook. Meat joints and some other foods like sponge puddings and Christmas puddings are typically timed according to their weight. Frozen foods need extra cooking time to allow for thawing.

When pressure cooking at 1 bar/15 psi (gauge), approximate cooking times are one minute for shredded cabbage, seven minutes for boiled potatoes (if cut small, not diced) and three minutes for fresh green beans. If the pressure is released naturally after timing (see Pressure release methods for details), cooking times are even shorter. Food cooks more quickly when cut into smaller pieces.

Some recipes may require cooking at lower than 1 bar/15 psi (gauge) e.g. fresh vegetables, as these can easily overcook. Many pressure cookers have 2 or more selectable pressure settings or weights.

Some pressure cookers have a lower or higher maximum pressure than 1 bar/15 psi (gauge) or can be adjusted to different pressures for some recipes; cooking times will increase or decrease accordingly. This is typically done by having different regulator weights or different pressure or temperature settings. Some pressure cookers operate at lower pressures than others. If the recipe is devised for a higher pressure and the pressure cooker does not reach that pressure, the cooking time can be increased to compensate.

=== Efficiency ===
Pressure cookers are considerably more expensive than conventional saucepans of the same size.

The minimum quantity of water or liquid that keeps a pressure cooker filled with steam is sufficient, so pressure cookers can use much less liquid than the amount required for conventional cooking. When less water or liquid is heated, the food reaches its cooking temperature faster and less energy is required than that of boiling, steaming, or oven cooking. It is also not necessary to immerse food in water. Additionally, with non-venting pressure cookers, steam isn't continually escaping, thus evaporation losses are non existent once it has reached pressure. Overall, energy used by third generation pressure cookers can be as much as 70% lower than conventional pan cooking.

=== Effect on food ===
Pressure cooking requires much less water than conventional boiling, so food can be ready sooner.

Because of this, vitamins and minerals are not leached (dissolved) away by water, as they would be if food were boiled in large amounts of water. Due to the shorter cooking time, vitamins are preserved relatively well during pressure cooking.

Several foods can be cooked together in the pressure cooker, either for the same amount of time or added later for different times. Manufacturers provide steamer baskets to allow more foods to be cooked together inside the pressure cooker.

Not only is this steam energy transmitted quickly to food, it is also transmitted rapidly to any micro-organisms that are present, easily killing even the deadliest types that are able to survive at the boiling point. Because of this enhanced germ killing ability, a pressure cooker can be used as an effective sanitizer for jam pots, glass baby bottles, or for water while camping.

=== Foods unsuitable for pressure cooking ===
Some foods are not recommended for pressure cooking. Foods such as noodles, pasta, cranberries, cereals and oatmeal can expand too much, froth and sputter, potentially blocking the steam vent and creating an unsafe condition.

== Use as weapons ==
The appliance has been adapted as a crude type of bomb, which has been used in terrorist attacks.

- 2006 Mumbai train bombings
- 2010 Stockholm bombings (failed to explode)
- 2010 Times Square car bombing attempt (failed to explode)
- 2013 Boston Marathon bombing
- 2016 New York and New Jersey bombings
- 2017 Manchester Arena bombing

== Related devices ==
An autoclave (≥ 121 °C) is a type of pressure cooker used by laboratories and hospitals to sterilize equipment. A stovetop autoclave is essentially a higher-pressure cooker with a gauge, used as an autoclave in poorer areas.

Pressure canners are large pressure cookers which have the capacity to hold jars used in home canning. Pressure canners are specifically designed for canning, whereas ordinary pressure cookers are not recommended for canning due to the risk of botulism poisoning. Pressure canners hold heat (≥ 115 °C) and pressure for much longer than ordinary pressure cookers; these factors are a critical part of the total processing time required to destroy harmful microbes such as bacterial spores.

Pressure fryers are used for deep fat frying under pressure, because ordinary pressure cookers are not suitable for pressure frying.

An air fryer pressure cooker (not to be confused with a pressure fryer) is a recent combination of a pressure cooker and an air fryer, with two separate lids, one for pressure cooking and one for air frying. The air frying lid has a convection fan inside that allows it to air fry foods, similar to an air fryer oven. This innovation was popularized by the Ninja Foodi Pressure Cooker, marketed as the first pressure cooker that can crisp and air fry.

A pressure oven is a recent combination of an oven and pressure cooker, usually as a countertop convection oven. Pressure ovens operate at low pressures, 10 kilopascals (1.5 psi), compared to other pressure cookers. Their main function is as an enhanced oven or broiler for meat and poultry, avoiding drying. As such, they often include a rotisserie. Although having insufficient pressure for most conventional pressure cooking functions, they do also have non-pressure oven modes.

== See also ==
- Safety valve
- List of cooking appliances
