= Denis Papin =

French physicist, mathematician and inventor (1647–1713)

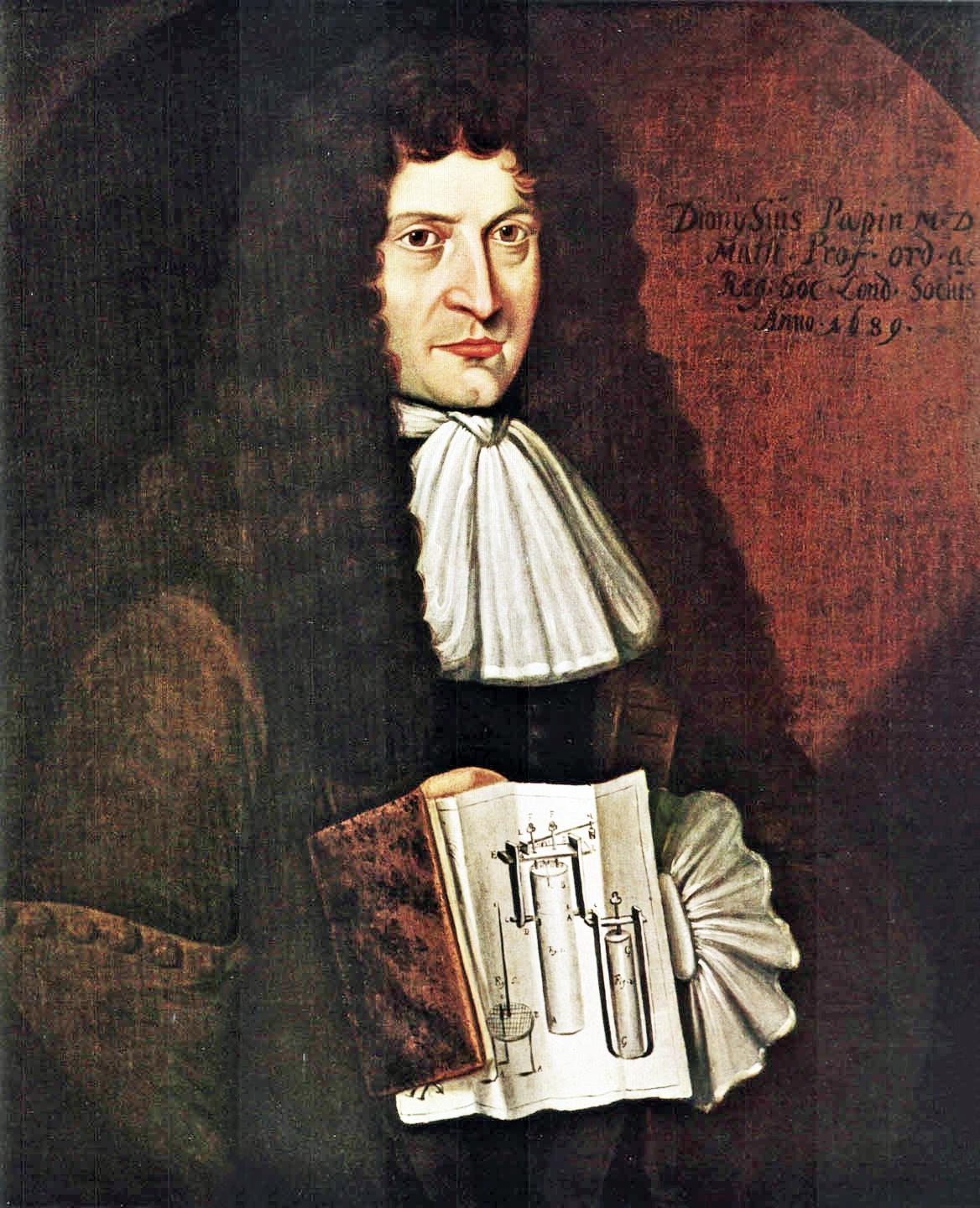
- Denis Papin, unknown artist, 1689
- Born: 22 August 1647; Chitenay, now Loir-et-Cher, France
- Died: 26 August 1713 (aged 66); London, Great Britain
- Education: University of Angers
- Known for: Steam digester
- Scientific career
- Workplaces: University of Marburg, Royal Society

Denis Papin FRS (French pronunciation: [dəni papɛ̃]; 22 August 1647 – 26 August 1713) was a French Huguenot physicist, mathematician and inventor, best known for his pioneering invention of the steam digester, the forerunner of the pressure cooker, the steam engine, the centrifugal pump, and a submersible boat.

He started his career in his native France, before emigrating to London, in 1675, and rising to being on the staff of the Royal Society, in 1684. As a Huguenot, he was stripped of his French citizenship, and denied a return to France after Louis XIV invoked the Edict of Fontainebleau in 1685. From 1687-1707 he held a position as a mathematics professor of the University of Marburg, Germany, before returning to England the last 5 years of his life. In spite of his many discoveries he died a pauper, and the date of his death and burial site were lost for 303 years.

== Early life and education ==
Denis Papin was born into a Calvinist family in Chitenay (Loir-et-Cher, Centre-Val de Loire Région), but attended a Jesuit school there. In 1661, he attended the University of Angers, from which he graduated with a medical degree in 1669.

== Career ==
In 1673 in Paris, Papin worked with Christiaan Huygens and learnt to know Gottfried Leibniz, who was about the same age as him. Papin became interested in using a vacuum to generate motive power.

Due to increasing repression on the Huguenots in France, he first visited London in 1675, where he worked with Robert Boyle from 1676 to 1679, publishing an account of his work in Continuation of New Experiments (1680). During this period, Papin invented the steam digester, a type of pressure cooker with a safety valve. He first addressed the Royal Society in 1679 on the subject of his digester, and remained mostly in London.

In 1681, Papin rose to become head of the experimental department at the accademia publica di scienze in Venice and in 1684 became a member of the staff of the Royal Society, whose chairman was Robert Boyle. During this time he also worked on steam cannons in Venice. Papin was denied return to France after Louis XIV invoked the Edict of Fontainebleau ending religious freedom for Protestants in 1685.

In about 1687, he left France to take up an academic post in Marburg Germany, one of the few calvinist territories in germany at the time, joining fellow Huguenot exiles from France. In 1689, Papin suggested that a force pump or bellows could maintain the pressure and fresh air inside a diving bell. (Engineer John Smeaton utilised this design in 1789.)

In 1690, having observed the mechanical power of atmospheric pressure on his 'digester', Papin built a model of a piston steam engine, the first of its kind. In 1705 while teaching mathematics at the University of Marburg, he developed a second steam engine with the help of Gottfried Leibniz, based on an invention by Thomas Savery, but this used steam pressure rather than atmospheric pressure. Details of the engine were published in 1707.

In 1705, Papin constructed a ship powered by hand-cranked paddles to return to London with his wife and children. An apocryphal story originating in 1851 by Louis Figuire held that this ship was steam-powered (paddlesteamer) rather than hand-powered and that it was therefore the first steam-powered vehicle of any kind. The myth was refuted as early as 1880 by Ernst Gerland, though still it finds credulous expression in some contemporary scholarly work.the paddlesteamer (1707).

Papin's ship was said to have been destroyed in 1707 by the boatmen of Munden who feared it would threaten their livelihood. The scene of boatmen destroying Papin's ship is depicted in several pieces of art in the eighteenth century and serves as an example of the resistance and fear inspired by the creative destruction that accompanies new technology.

Later, at the iron foundry in Veckerhagen (now Reinhardshagen), he cast the world's first steam cylinder.

In 1707, Papin returned to London leaving his wife in Germany. Several of his papers were put before the Royal Society between 1707 and 1712 without acknowledging or paying him, about which he complained bitterly. Papin's ideas included a description of his 1690 atmospheric steam engine, similar to that built and put into use by Thomas Newcomen in 1712, thought to be the year of Papin's death.

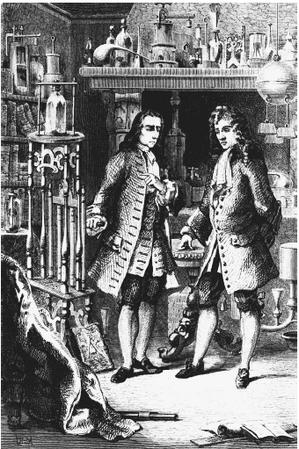
Robert Boyle and Denis Papin inspecting Papin's digester

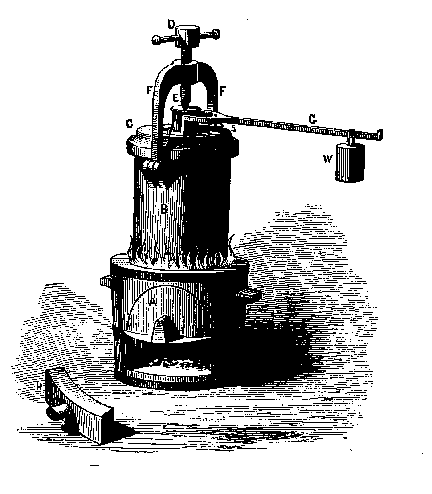
Denis Papin's steam digester (1679)

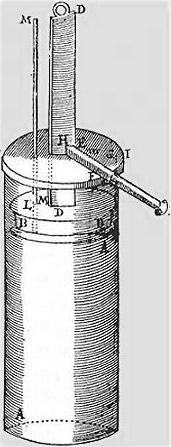
Papin's first piston steam pump, 1690

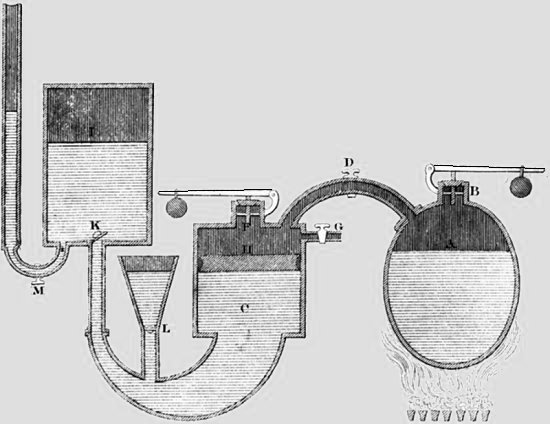
Papin's second steam pump, 1706/07

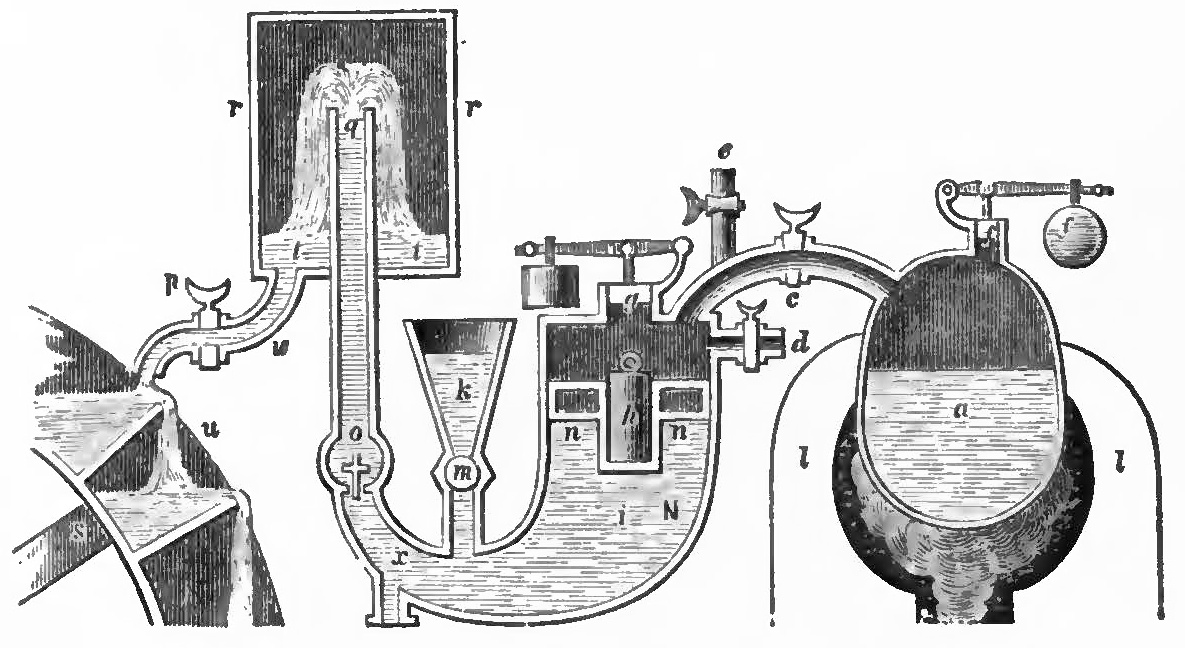
Papin's second steam pump driving a water wheel (on the left), 1706/07

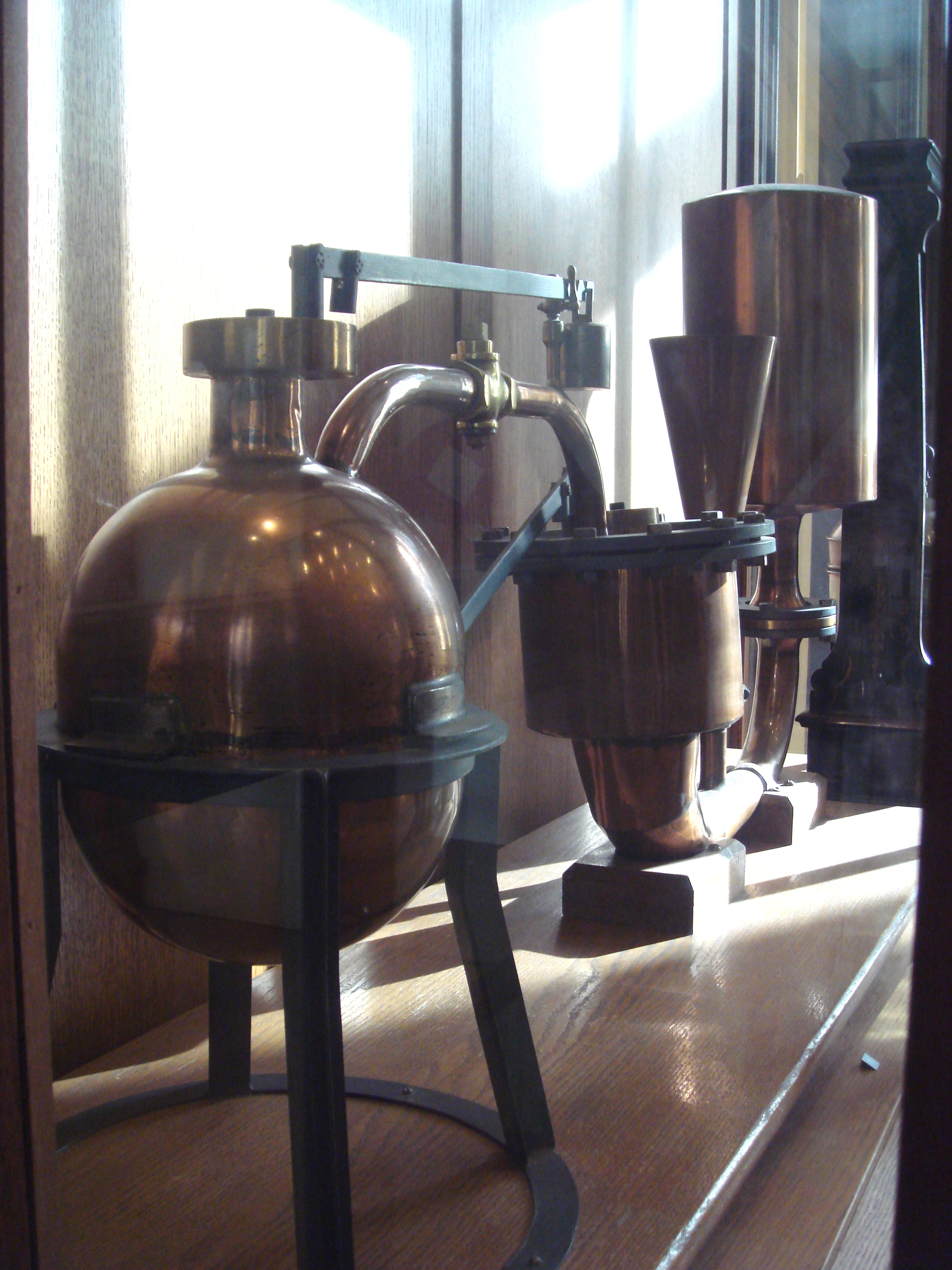
Steam-driven water-lifting machine by Papin in 1707, reconstruction, from Nouvelle manière d'élever l'eau par la force du feu. Musée des Arts et Métiers

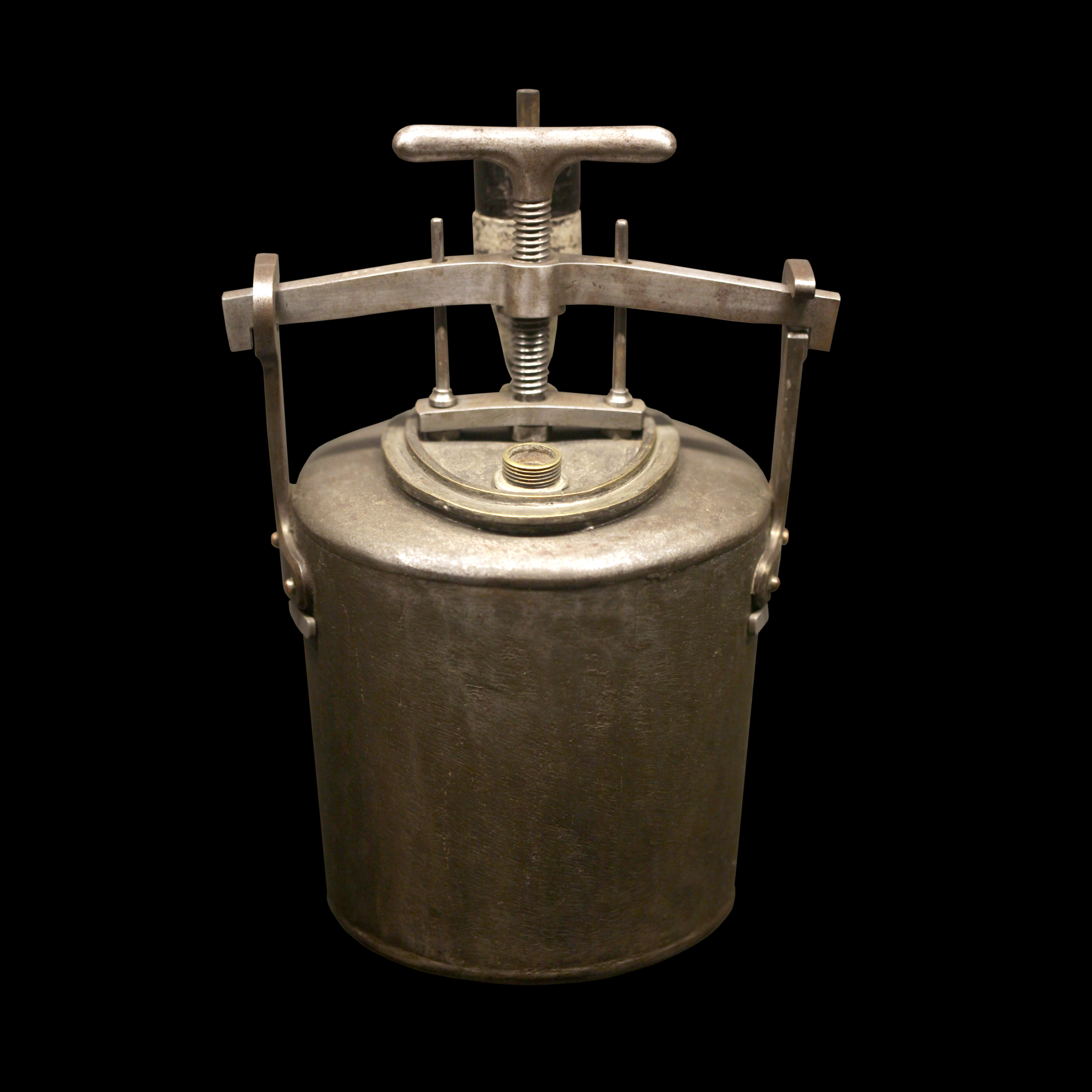
A "Papin" cooking pot, late 18th century

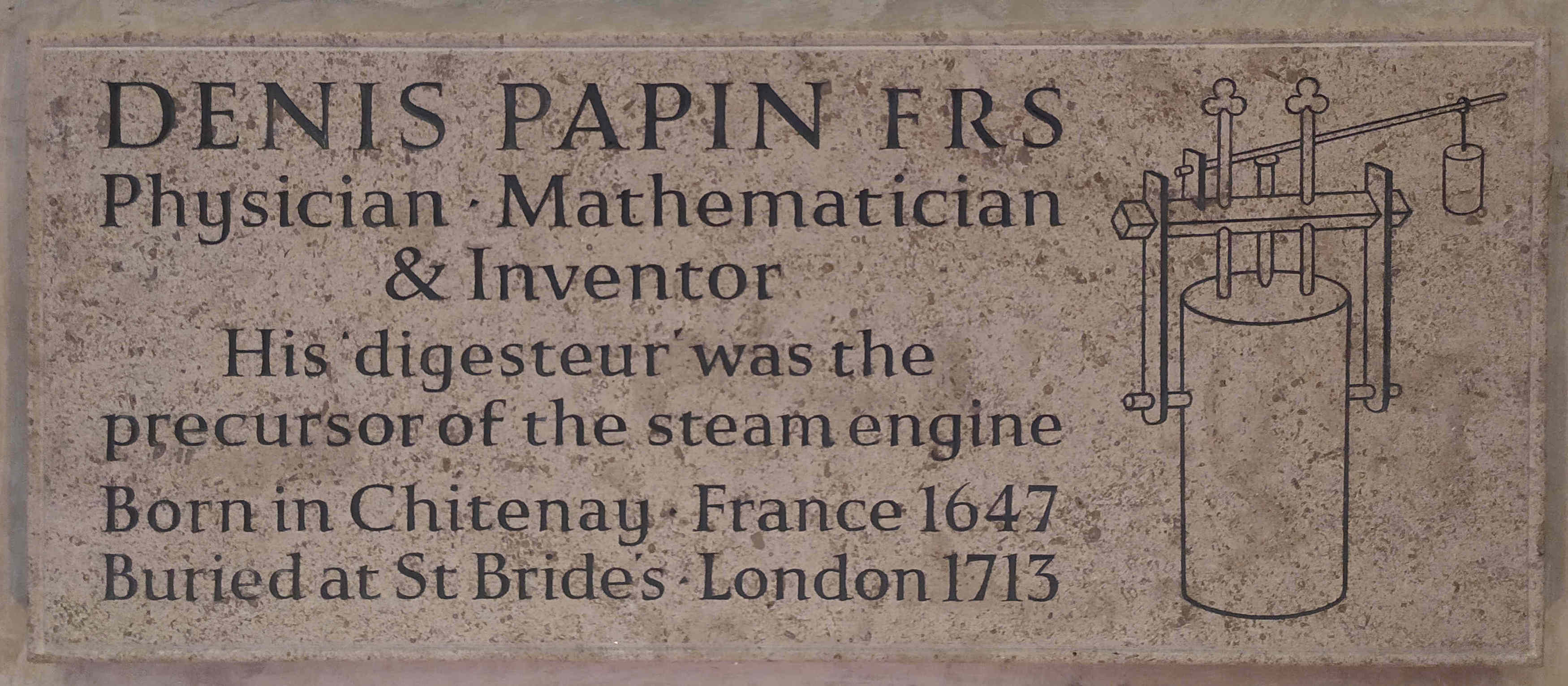
Papin's Memorial in St Bride's Church

== Personal life and death ==
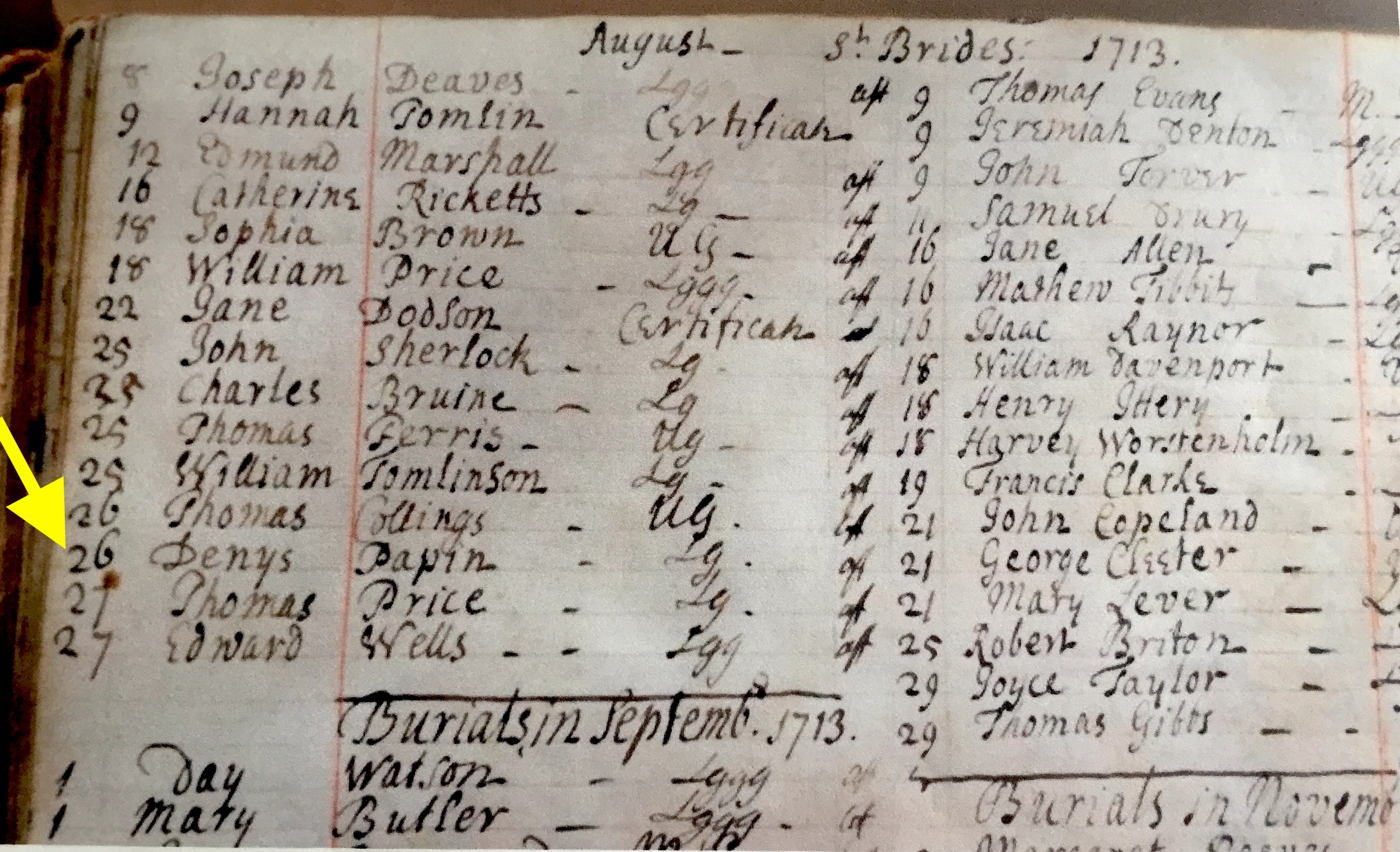
The Register from St Bride's Church showing the date of Papin's burial

Papin married at the age of 44 in 1691 in Marburg.

The last surviving evidence of Papin's whereabouts came in a letter he wrote dated 23 January 1712. At the time he was destitute ("I am in a sad case") [Royal Society Archives, 1894, Vol. 7, 74]. Until 2016, it was believed that he died that year and was buried in an unmarked grave in London.

In 2016, a record for the burial of a “Denys Papin” was discovered in an 18th-century Register of Marriages & Burials, It originally came from St Bride's Church, Fleet Street, London, but is stored in the London Metropolitan Archives. The record states that Denys Papin was buried at St Bride's on 26 August 1713 – just a few days after his 66th birthday – and that he was buried in the Lower Ground, one of the two burial areas belonging to the church at the time.

Since the 2016 discovery of the place and date of Papin's burial in 1713, a memorial plaque has been erected in the West Entrance of St Bride's Church, Fleet Street, London, to commemorate his life and his achievements.

== Legacy ==
Boulevard Denis Papin in Carcassonne is named after him as well as a street in Saint-Michel, Montreal. There is also a statue of Papin with his invention in Blois, at the top of the Escalier Denis Papin, a stairway.

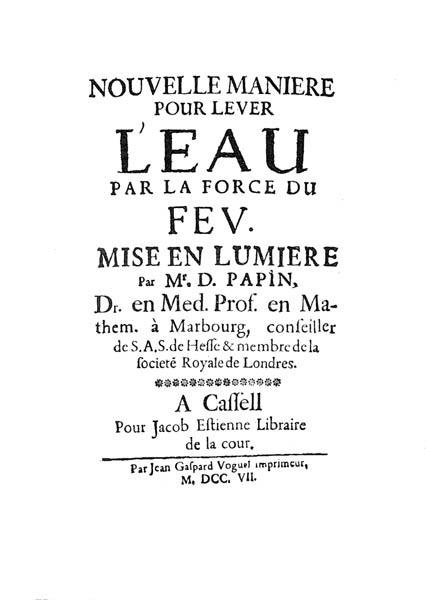
Nouvelle manière pour lever l'eau par la force du feu (1707)

== Works ==
- — (1707). Nouvelle manière pour lever l'eau par la force du feu ... par m. D. Papin. Dédicace à la société royale de Londres. A Cassell: pour Jacob Estienne libraire de la cour, par Jean Gaspard Voguel imprimeur.
