= Steam digester =

17th-century high-pressure cooker

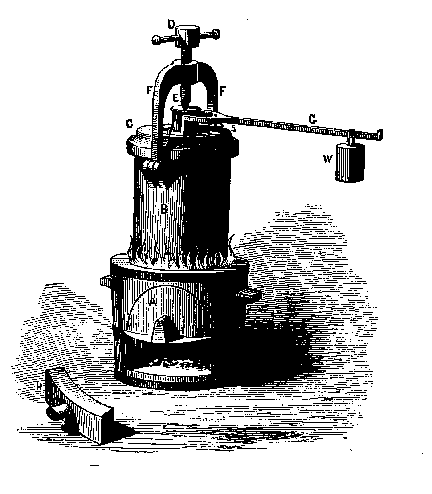
Denis Papin's steam digester (1679)

The steam digester or bone digester (also known as Papin's digester) is a high-pressure cooker invented by French physicist Denis Papin in 1679. It is a device for extracting fats from bones in a high-pressure steam environment, which also makes the bones brittle enough to be easily ground into bone meal. It is the forerunner of the autoclave and the domestic pressure cooker.

The steam-release valve, which was invented for Papin's digester following various explosions of the earlier models, inspired the development of the piston-and-cylinder steam engine.

== History ==
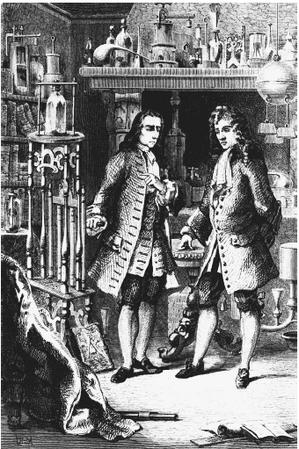
Robert Boyle and Denis Papin inspecting Papin's digester

The artificial vacuum was first produced in 1643 by Italian scientist Evangelista Torricelli and further developed by German scientist Otto von Guericke with his Magdeburg hemispheres. Guerike's demonstration was documented by Gaspar Schott, in a book that was read by Robert Boyle. Boyle and his assistant Robert Hooke improved Guericke's air pump design and built their own. From this, through various experiments, they formulated what is called Boyle's law, which states that the volume of a body of an ideal gas is inversely proportional to its pressure. Soon Jacques Charles formulated Charles's law, which states that the volume of a gas at a constant pressure is proportional to its temperature. Boyle's and Charles' laws were combined into the ideal gas law.

Based on these concepts in 1679 Boyle's associate, Denis Papin, built a bone digester, which is a closed vessel with a tightly fitting lid that confines steam until a high pressure is generated. Later designs implemented a steam release valve to keep the machine from exploding. By watching the valve rhythmically moving up and down, Papin conceived the idea of a piston and cylinder engine. He did not, however, follow through with his design. In 1697, independent of Papin's designs, engineer Thomas Savery built the world's first steam engine. By 1712 an improved design based on Papin's ideas was developed by Thomas Newcomen.

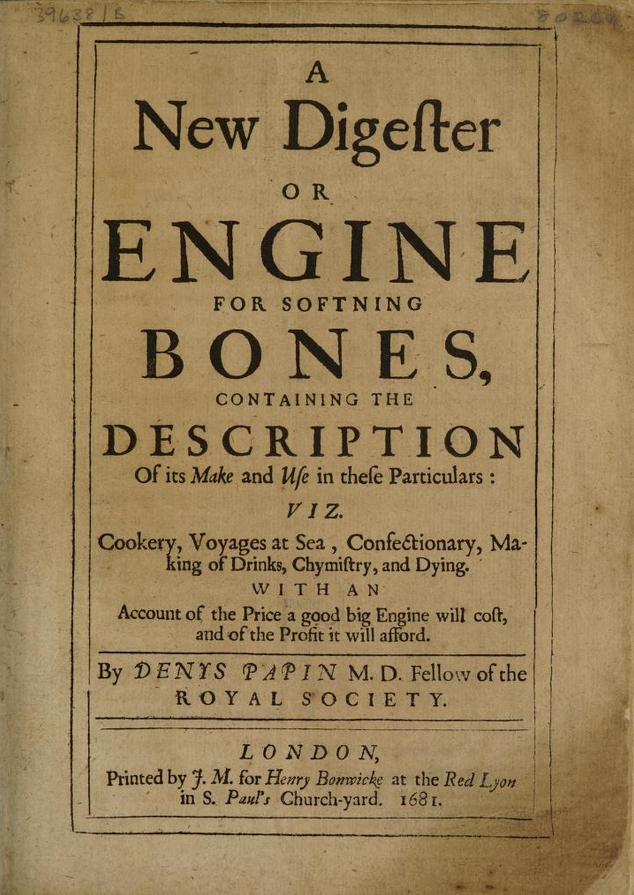
Title page of "A new digester or engine for softening bones," by Denis Papin

Boyle speaks of Papin as having gone to England in the hope of finding a place in which he could satisfactorily pursue his favorite studies. Boyle himself had already been long engaged in the study of pneumatics, and had been especially interested in the investigations which had been original with Guericke. He admitted young Papin into his laboratory, and the two philosophers worked together at these attractive problems. He probably invented his "digester" while in England, and it was first described in a brochure written in English, under the title, "A New Digester or Engine for Softening Bones." It was subsequently published in Paris.

This was a vessel with a safety valve, which can be tightly closed by a screw and a lid. Food can be cooked along with water in the vessel when the vessel is heated, and the vessel's internal temperature can be raised by as much as the pressure inside the vessel will permit safely. The maximum pressure is limited by a weight placed on the safety valve lever. If the pressure exceeds this limit, the safety valve will be forced open and steam will escape until the pressure drops sufficient for the weight to close the valve again.

It is probable that this essential attachment to the steam boiler had previously been used for other purposes; but Papin is given the credit of having first made use of it to control the pressure of steam. In 1787, Antoine Lavoisier, in his Elements of Chemistry, refers to "Papin's digester" as an example of an environment where high pressure prevents evaporation when he explains that the pressure caused by evaporation of fluid prevents further evaporation.

== See also ==
- Steam engine
- History of thermodynamics
