= Weapon Systems Explosives Safety Review Board =

The United States Navy formed the Weapon System Explosives Safety Review Board (WSESRB) in 1967 as a result of two deadly accidents involving explosive ordnance aboard US aircraft carriers: the 1966 USS Oriskany fire, and the 1967 USS Forrestal fire. The subsequent investigation recommended an independent review process be established. The report highlighted the need to ensure explosives safety requirements are met for all munitions introduced to the Fleet.

As a result, the WSESRB was established. WSESRB participates in numerous weapons system safety-related meetings, technical reviews, and working groups.

The US Air Force and US Army have parallel boards to the Navy's WSESRB: the AF Nonnuclear Munitions Safety Board (NNMSB) and the Army Weapon Systems Safety Review Board (AWSSRB).

== Areas reviewed by weapon boards include ==
Safety and suitability for use in the system's predicted logistic and operational environments

- Hazard classification
- Insensitive munitions
- Final (type) qualification of energetics
- Lithium battery certification
- Human systems integration
