= Ronald J. Zlatoper =

American naval officer (1942–2022)

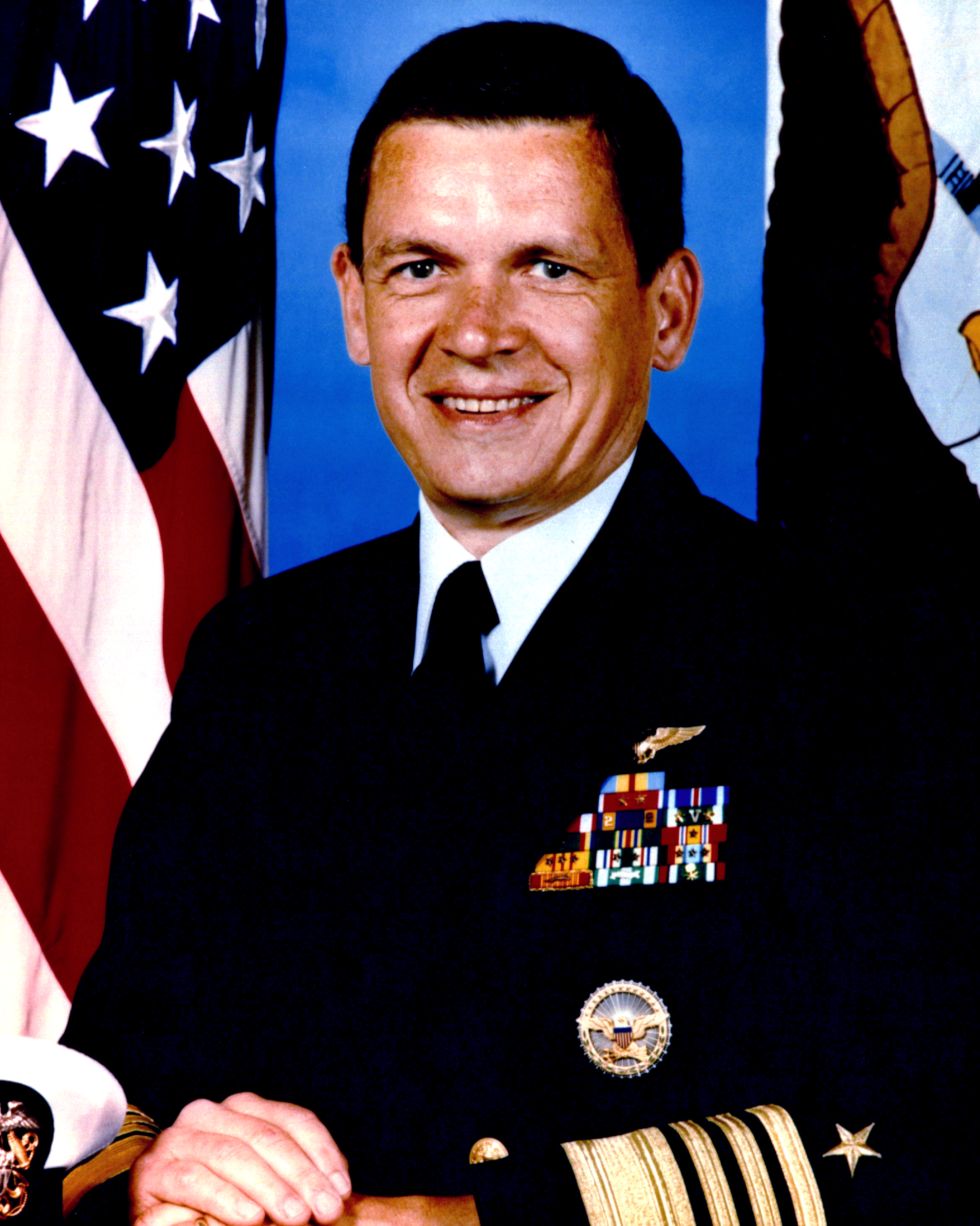
- Born: March 21, 1942; Cleveland, Ohio, U.S.
- Died: April 21, 2022 (aged 80); Atlanta, Georgia, U.S.
- Burial place: Arlington National Cemetery
- Military career
- Allegiance: United States
- Branch: United States Navy
- Service years: 1963–1996
- Rank: Admiral
- Nickname: Zap
- Commands: US Pacific Fleet; Chief of Naval Personnel
- Conflicts: Vietnam War; Gulf War
- Awards: Defense Superior Service Medal; Legion of Merit (3); Distinguished Flying Cross; Air Medal

Ronald Joseph Zlatoper (March 21, 1942 – April 21, 2022) was a United States Navy four-star admiral and naval aviator who served as commander in chief, United States Pacific Fleet (CINCPACFLT) from 1994 to 1996.

Zlatoper was born in Cleveland, Ohio.

As a rear admiral, he commanded Carrier Group Seven from the USS Ranger (CV-61) during the Gulf War.

Zlatoper was the founder of Strategic Transitions Research. He served as co-chairman and chief executive officer of Sanchez Computer Associates, Inc. He served as a trustee of Rensselaer Polytechnic Institute. He served on the boards of Penn State University-Great Valley, School of Business & Public Management at the George Washington University, U.S.S. Missouri Memorial Association, and the Military Aviation Museum of the Pacific. He was a regent for Chaminade University. He was also active on the boards of the Pacific Aviation Museum Pearl Harbor, East–West Center, Vietnam Veterans Memorial Foundation, Chamber of Commerce of Hawai'i — Military Affairs Council, and Catholic Charities Hawai'i. He was a member of the Alexis de Tocqueville Society of the United Way.

As an undergraduate at RPI, Zlatoper was a member of Pi Kappa Phi fraternity. He was inducted into the fraternity's hall of fame in 2014. He received his master's degree in management from the MIT Sloan School of Management.

He died on April 21, 2022, in Atlanta, Georgia.

== Education ==
Ronald J. Zlatoper was born in Cleveland, Ohio and attended St Joseph's High School. He earned a Naval Reserve Officer Training scholarship to Rensselaer Polytechnic Institute, where he earned a BS in Mathematics (1959). He received an MS in Automated Data Science from George Washington University (1970), and graduated with distinction from the Naval War College (1973) and an MS in Management from MIT's Sloan School of Management (1975).

== Naval career ==
Zlatoper (call sign "Zap") began his flight training in Pensacola, Florida.

- June 5, 1963 - Commissioned an ensign.and was commissioned an ensign. That same year, Zlatoper received basic jet training at the Naval Auxiliary Air Station (NAAS) in Meridian, Mississippi.
- May 1964 - He received advanced jet training at NAAS in Kingsville, Texas.
- October 30, 1964 - Ensign Zlatoper earned the designation of Naval Aviator (HTA).
- November 1964 - He reported to Attack Squadron FOUR TWO and was selected to be one of five new pilots to fly the new A-6 Intruder bomber.
- December 1964 - Ensign Zlatoper was promoted to lieutenant (junior grade). After completion of his training in the A-6, Lieutenant Zlatoper was assigned to attack carrier USS Constellation and deployed to Vietnam in 1966.
- June 1967 - Returning stateside, Lieutenant Zlatoper was assigned to attack carrier USS Forrestal and was deployed again to Vietnam.
- March 1968 - Lieutenant Zlatoper reported to VA-42 at Oceana, Virginia as a squadron flight instructor.
- February 1970 - Lieutenant Zlatoper was promoted to lieutenant commander. It was during this assignment that he earned his MS in Automated Data Processing.
- March 1971 - Lieutenant Commander Zlatoper embarked on attack carrier USS John F. Kennedy for deployment in the Mediterranean Sea.
- August 1977 - After earning his MS in Management from MIT's Sloan School of Management Lieutenant Commander Zlatoper reported to the Office of the Chief of Naval Operations in Washington D.C. as program coordinator for guided and air-launched weapons and was promoted to commander.
- June 1979 - Commander Zlatoper assumed command of the VA-85 Black Falcons, embarking again on the USS Forrestal.
- October 1980 - Commander Zlatoper was ordered back to Washington D.C. as executive assistant to the director of the Office of Program Appraisal, Major General Colin Powell.
- July 1982 - Commander Zlatoper assumed command of Carrier Air Wing ONE and then embarked on the carrier USS America for a deployment in the mediterranean and Indian Oceans.
- August 1983 - Commander Zlatoper returned to Washington D.C. as military assistant to Secretary of Defense, Caspar Weinberger.
- October 1983 Commander Zlatoper was promoted to captain.
- August 1985 - Captain Zlatoper reported to Fighter Squadron ONE TWO FOUR to train in various other carrier air wing aircraft, including the F-14 Tomcat fighter jet.
- February 1986 - Captain Zlatoper assumed command of Carrier Air Wing FIFTEEN.
- May 1987 - Captain Zlatoper assumed duty as chief of staff for Commander U.S. Seventh Fleet.
- August 1988 - Captain Zlatoper reported to Navy Military Personnel Command as director, Distribution Department.
- October 1, 1989 - Captain Zlatoper was promoted to rear admiral.
- July 1990 - Rear Admiral Zlatoper assumed command of Carrier Group SEVEN and was deployed to the Arabian Gulf on USS Ranger as part of Desert Storm where he led surface combat operations in the northern Arabian Gulf.
- November 1991 - Rear Admiral Zlatoper assumed duty as Deputy CNO for Manpower and Personnel/Chief of Naval Personnel, where he was promoted to vice admiral.
- July 22, 1994 - Vice Admiral Zlatoper was designated admiral (four-star).
- August 1994 - Admiral Zlatoper assumed duty as Commander-in-chief, U.S. Pacific Fleet, responsible for over 200,000 personnel and 190 ships.
- January 1, 1997 - Admiral Zlatoper retired from the United States Navy.

== 1967 USS Forrestal fire ==
On July 29, 1967, Zlatoper, then a lieutenant, kept a careful record of events in the squadron duty officer log of the 1967 USS Forrestal fire.

== Honors ==
He received numerous personal decorations, including the Defense Distinguished Service Medal, the Navy Distinguished Service Medal, the Legion of Merit, the Distinguished Flying Cross, the Meritorious Service Medal, the Air Medal, and the Navy Commendation Medal (with Combat "V"), and various campaign and unit awards. He was the recipient of the Japanese Grand Cordon of the Order of the Rising Sun and the Korean Presidential Tong Il medal.

- Defense Distinguished Service Medal
- Navy Distinguished Service Medal (two awards)
- Legion of Merit (three awards)
- Distinguished Flying Cross
- Meritorious Service Medal
- Air Medal (11 awards, three individual and eight strike/flight)
- Navy and Marine Corps Commendation Medal with Valor Device

== Naval Career Highlights ==
During his distinguished career, Admiral Zlatoper flew 151 combat missions, and flew 4,375 hours with 1,031 fixed and 10 helicopter carrier/ship recoveries.

In addition to the medals listed above, Admiral Zlatoper also received the Navy Commendation Medal (three awards, one with Combat "V"), Navy Unit Commendation (two awards), Meritorious Unit Commendation, National Defense Service Medal (two awards), Vietnam Service Medal (three campaign stars), Southeast Asia Service Medal (two bronze stars), Sea Service Ribbon (four bronze stars), Republic of Vietnam Gallantry Cross Unit Citation, Republic of Vietnam Campaign Medal, Kuwait Liberation Medal (Saudi Arabia), Kuwait Liberation Medal (Kuwait), Japanese Grand Cordon of the Order of the Rising Sun, and the Republic of Korea Order of National Security Merit Tong-II Medal.

== Civilian Career Highlights ==
Following his retirement, Zlatoper founded Strategic Transitions Research. He was co-chairman of Sanchez Computer Associates, a banking software company, and led the company's market capitalization from $50 million to over $1 billion. He became chairman of the James Cambell Estate, a trust with more than $2 billion in real estate holdings.

He served as a trustee of Renssalaer Polytechnic Institute, and served on the board of Penn State University and the board of advisors of the School of Public Management of the George Washington University.

He also served on the boards of many philanthropic organizations like Catholic Charities of Hawaii and the Alexis de Tocqueville Society of the United Way.
