= Mark 65 bomb =

Mark 65 General-Purpose (GP) Bomb
- Type: Low-drag general-purpose bomb
- Place of origin: United States

Production history
- Designed: 1939
- Produced: 1939

The Mark 65 one thousand-pound (450 kg) general-purpose bomb was developed for the U.S. military in 1939. The designation was AN-M65.

== Design ==
The M65 design was specialized to contain a higher portion of explosive weight in a lighter casing. Up until this period a typical general-purpose bomb was 50% casing weight and 50% explosive material. The AN series of designs used a lighter-weight higher-strength steel casing with the goal of having up to 65% of the finished bomb weight be explosive material.

== Operational history ==
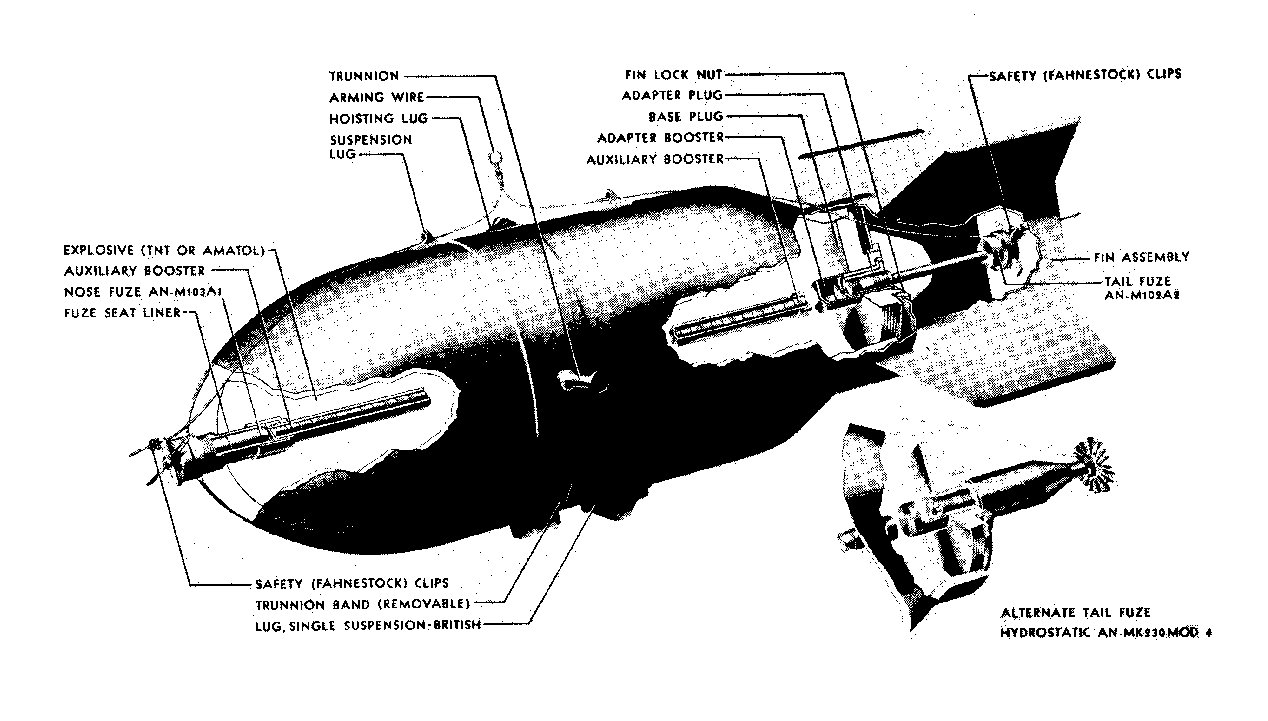
Cutaway of AN-M65 GP bomb

The Mark 65 entered production in 1939 and was used extensively in World War II and the Korean War. As more bombing roles were shifted to light jet aircraft that carried bombs externally rather than inside an internal bomb bay, the shape of bomb casings was studied. In the early 1950s this research caused production to shift from the AN series bombs to the Mark 80 series streamlined designs still in use today.

During the height of the American bombing campaign in Vietnam during 1967, the Mark 80 series bombs were being used faster than they were being manufactured, leading to a shortage in the Mark 83 one thousand-pound bomb that had replaced the Mark 65 in naval service. To fill the shortage until new Mark 83 bombs could be delivered, the U.S. Navy used the remaining Mark 65 bombs it had left over from the Korean War. An indeterminate number of these stored Mark 65 weapons were used until the supply was exhausted.

This weapon was involved in the 1967 USS Forrestal fire, which killed 134 sailors and injured 161.
