= 1969 USS Enterprise fire =

Fire on a US aircraft carrier

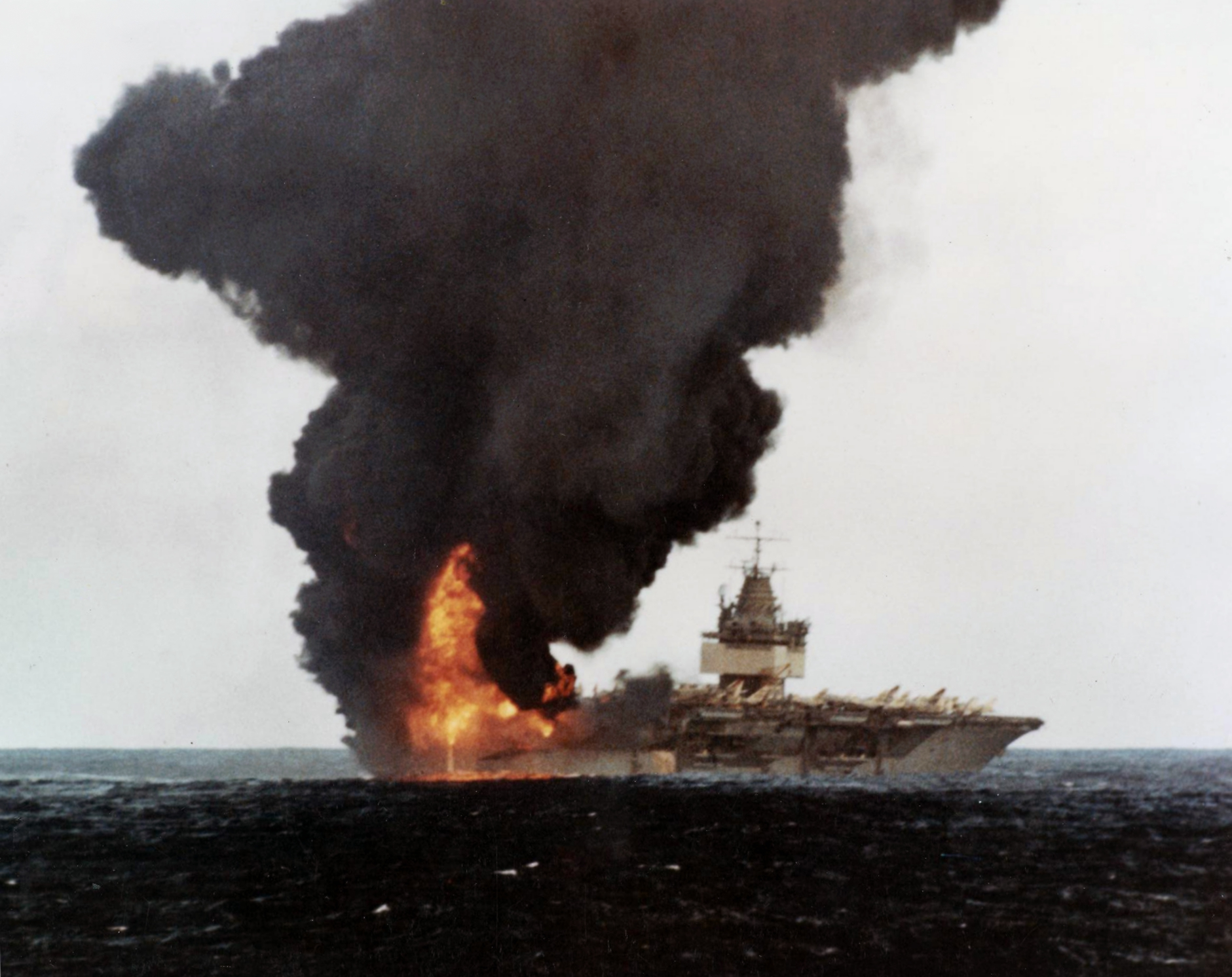
- Fire on the stern of USS Enterprise
- Date: January 14, 1969
- Time: About 8:18 a.m. local time
- Location: Pacific Ocean, about 70 miles southwest of Pearl Harbor, near Hawaii; 20°27′7″N 158°27′5″W
- Casualties: 15 aircraft destroyed
- Deaths: 28
- Injuries: 314

On January 14, 1969, a major fire and a series of explosions aboard the aircraft carrier USS Enterprise off the coast of O'ahu, Hawaii, United States, led to the deaths of 28 sailors and injuries to 314 others. Additionally, 15 aircraft were destroyed in the incident. A Zuni rocket detonated under a plane's wing, causing a fire that touched off more munitions, blowing holes in the flight deck that allowed burning jet fuel to enter the ship. The cost of replacing the aircraft and repairing the ship cost over US$126 million (roughly $1 billion adjusted for inflation in 2022).

== Background ==
On January 14, 1969 Enterprise was off the coast of Hawaii conducting a final battle drill and Operational Readiness Inspection (ORI) before steaming for Vietnam. Additional personnel were aboard Enterprise to observe the ORI.

== Fire ==
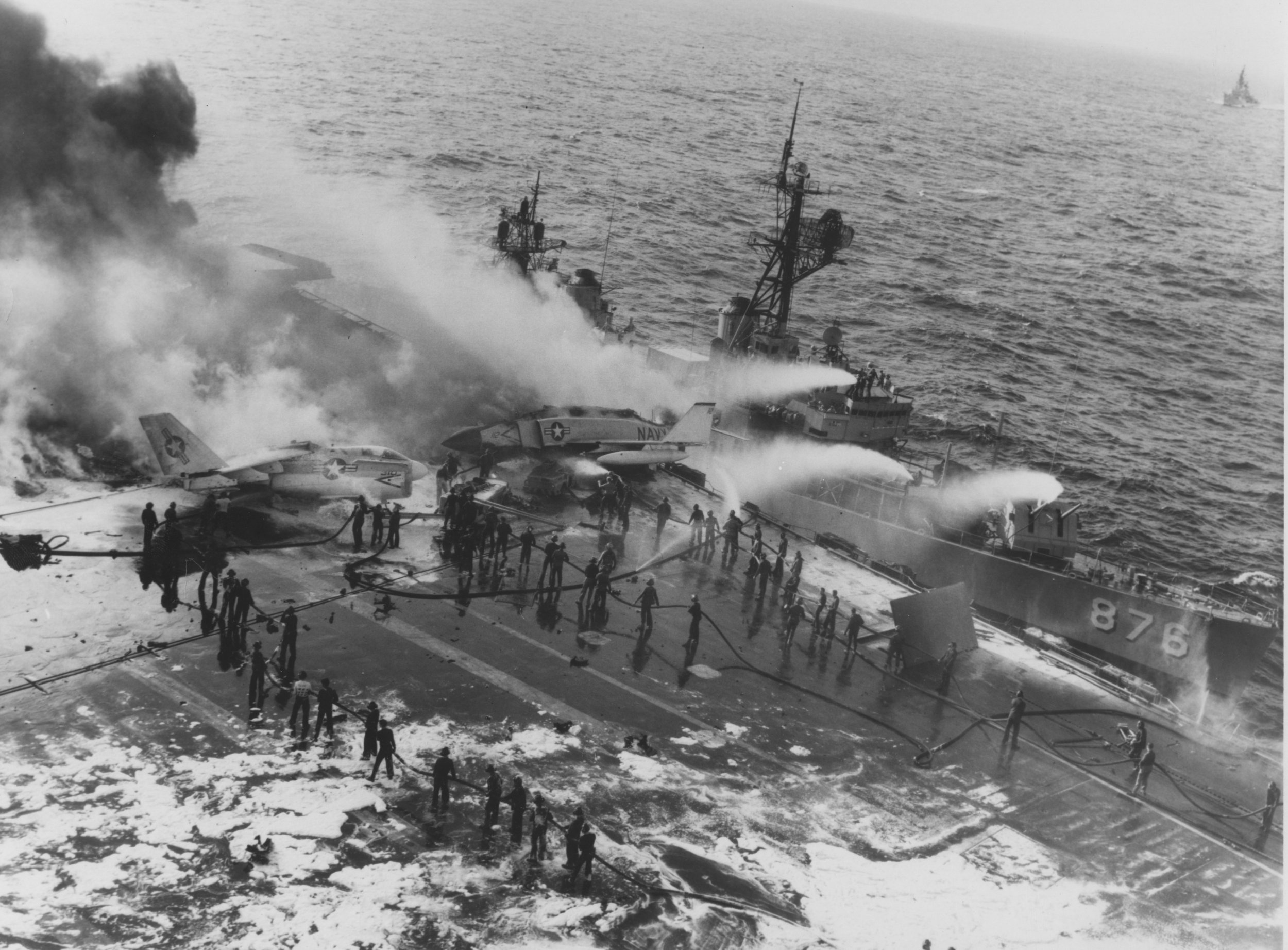
Sailors from the destroyer Rogers use their hoses to help fight fires aboard Enterprise.

About 8:18 a.m., Enterprise was turning to port to conduct flight operations. On the stern sat a McDonnell Douglas F-4 Phantom II armed with Zuni rockets. The exhaust from an MD-3A "Huffer", a tractor-mounted unit used to start aircraft, heated one of the Zunis until its 15-pound (6.8 kg) warhead of Composition B explosive exploded, perforating the aircraft's fuel tanks and igniting the JP-5 jet fuel. About one minute later, three more Zuni rockets exploded, blowing holes into the flight deck which allowed the burning jet fuel to pour into the level below. Captain Kent Lee, commanding officer of Enterprise, directed the port turn to continue after the first explosion, steering the ship into the wind to blow smoke away from the ship.

About three minutes after the initial explosion, a bomb exploded on the burning Phantom, blowing a hole of about 8 by 7 feet (2.4 by 2.1 m) in the flight deck. The heat ignited additional fires on the lower level, and debris made holes in the deck which allowed burning fuel to spread farther, entering the two lower levels and eventually the first deck. This explosion also severed nearby firehoses and damaged and rendered inoperable the twin-agent fire extinguishing system that provided firefighting foam to the area. Two 500 lb (227 kg) Mark 82 bombs soon detonated in succession; several minutes later three Mark 82 bombs in a bomb rack exploded. This blast tore a hole into the flight deck of about 18 by 22 feet (5.5 by 6.7 m) and ruptured a 6,000-US-gallon (23 m^{3}) fuel tank mounted on a KA-3B tanker aircraft; the ensuing fireball spread the fire further. There were 18 explosions, which blew eight holes into the flight deck and beyond.

The nuclear-powered cruiser Bainbridge and destroyer Rogers came to the stricken carrier's aid. It took the combined crews of the three ships about four hours to extinguish the fires.

== Aftermath ==
Bainbridge escorted Enterprise to Pearl Harbor that afternoon. After 51 days of repairs, Enterprise continued her regularly scheduled deployment.

This was the last of three major fires to befall U.S. aircraft carriers in the 1960s. It followed a fire aboard USS Oriskany on October 26, 1966, that killed 44 sailors and injured 156 more; and a fire aboard USS Forrestal on July 29, 1967, that killed 134 sailors and injured 161. The Forrestal fire was also started by a Zuni rocket which was accidentally launched into parked aircraft by a power surge, igniting a fuel fire that began to "cook off" 1,000-pound (450 kg) bombs. Procedural improvements after the Forrestal fire helped reduce damage and casualties in the Enterprise fire.

== Investigation ==
A JAG Manual investigation began immediately after the fire, in accordance with Navy policy. The investigation determined that the initial explosion was caused by the MD-3A "Huffer" exhaust overheating the Zuni rocket. Investigators also determined that an airman had observed the exhaust and had raised concerns about the placement of the huffer, but personnel were involved in other tasks and may not have completely understood what was being said due to the ambient noise on the flight deck. However, the investigators also noted that moving the unit might not have prevented the initial explosion due to the estimated temperature of the rocket by that time.

The Forrestal investigation revealed that only half of the ship's crew and none of the air wing had attended firefighting school. When the Enterprise fire erupted, 96 percent of the ship's crew had attended firefighting training, along with 86 percent of the air wing. Lack of redundancies in communication systems and firefighting components were deemed to have hurt firefighting operations. Further factors included a lack of communication between the Air Boss (who was responsible for flight and hangar deck firefighting) and the Damage Control Assistant (who was responsible for all other firefighting operations), and overloading the firefighting system by activating multiple systems at once.

Investigators generally praised the firefighting operation aboard Enterprise. Specific praise was given to the medical department, who were credited with saving countless lives, and to the establishment of a damage-control training team that helped with damage-control training. Enterprise had also established a competitive program between its repair parties to increase effectiveness. Praise was also directed to the captain of USS Rogers, who navigated his ship within feet of Enterprise to aid firefighting efforts.

The investigators recommended a redesign of the air-start unit to vent the exhaust upward instead of to the side. They also recommended educating flight deck personnel on ordnance cook-off temperatures and times, and increasing the length of the hose that delivers the air from the huffer to the aircraft. Other recommendations included: install redundant communication and control systems, improve communication between key senior personnel, and redesign the head covering worn by flight deck firefighters. Investigators also recommended cross-training shipboard dentists as anesthetists, as one had been assigned to Enterprise which allowed the medical department to perform additional emergency surgery during the fire.
