= John K. Beling =

US Navy admiral (1919–2010)

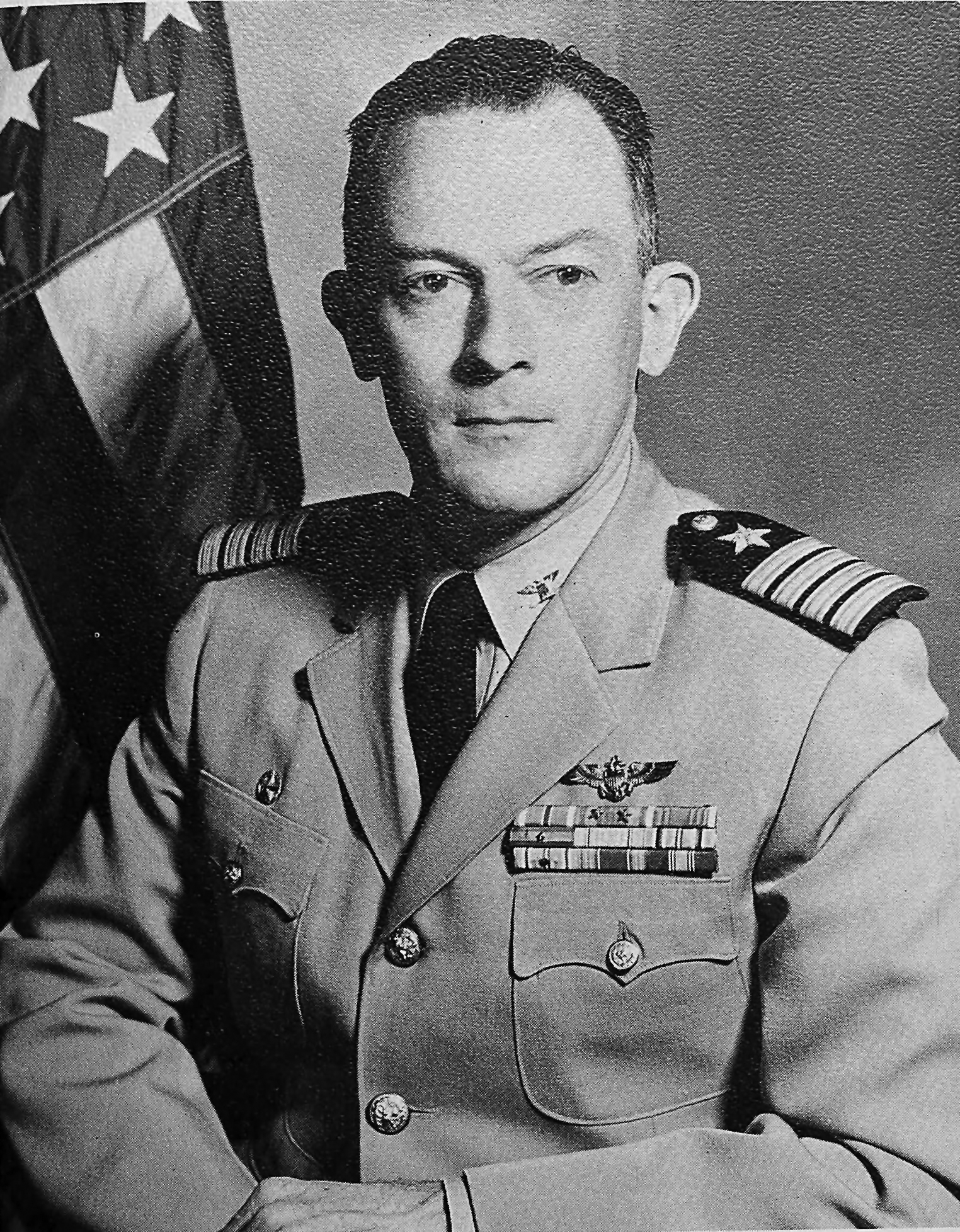
- Rear Admiral John K. Beling, USN (ret.) (as commanding officer of USS Forrestal)
- Born: John Kingsman Beling; October 29, 1919; New York City, New York
- Died: November 5, 2010 (aged 91); Reston, Virginia
- Military career
- Allegiance: United States of America
- Branch: United States Navy
- Service years: 1942–1973
- Rank: Rear Admiral
- Commands: Attack Squadron 72; Attack Squadron 43; Technical Branch, Atomic Energy Division; USS Alstede; USS Forrestal; Air, Surface and Electronic Warfare Division; Iceland Defense Force
- Conflicts: World War II; *Marianas campaign Vietnam War
- Awards: Legion of Merit; Distinguished Flying Cross; Purple Heart Medal; Air Medal with two gold stars Presidential Unit Citation

John Kingsman Beling (October 29, 1919 – November 5, 2010) was a rear admiral of the United States Navy whose final assignment was as commander, Iceland Defense Force in the early 1970s. Commissioned in 1942, he served as a Naval Aviator in the Pacific Theater in World War II, and was seriously burned when his aircraft was shot down during the Marianas Campaign. He made a full recovery from his injuries, and went on to serve in a variety of staff positions, attended the Naval War College, and commanded three attack squadrons and two ships.

Beling was commanding officer of the aircraft carrier USS Forrestal at the time of the July 29, 1967 fire that killed 134 sailors and officers, injured 161, and caused $72 million (1967 dollars) in damage to the ship. The Navy investigation into the fire cleared Beling of wrongdoing. After retiring from the Navy as a rear admiral in 1973, Beling worked as a Department of Defense civilian, as well as for a defense contractor, before retiring for good in 1985. He died November 5, 2010, in Reston, Virginia.

== Early life and career ==
Beling was born in New York City on October 29, 1919, and was raised in Harrington Park, New Jersey. He was the son of Aelian Arnold Beling (b. Ceylon. 1879), the younger brother of Ceylonese artist William Wright Beling II (1867–1928), and Mable Ashe Jackson (b. 1886).

John Kingsman Beling graduated with a degree in mechanical engineering from the Stevens Institute of Technology in 1941. After the Japanese attack on Pearl Harbor on December 7, 1941, Beling joined the Naval Reserve as an aviation specialist, and was commissioned an Ensign upon completion of flight training in 1943, after which he headed to the Pacific theater as a dive bomber pilot with Bombing Squadron ONE (VB-1). Beling was shot down over the island of Yap during the Marianas Campaign in 1944. Although badly burned, Beling was able to make his way out to open sea, where a seaplane from the cruiser USS Biloxi spotted him. After being hospitalized for his burns, he rejoined the fleet as a fighter pilot.

Beling received a Ph.D. in physics from the Massachusetts Institute of Technology in 1951, and afterwards served in a variety of operational, research & development, testing, and evaluation assignments, including a tour at the Office of Naval Research in London and at the Lawrence Livermore Laboratory. He also served in Air Test and Development Squadron FIVE (VX-5), and twice served in the Office of the Chief of Naval Operations, in roles pertaining to weapons development. He also served as Assistant Chief of Staff and Force Training Officer at the headquarters of Commander, Naval Air Force Atlantic (COMNAVAIRLANT) at NAS Norfolk, Virginia. Aside from his command of Forrestal, from May 1966 to September 1967, Beling commanded two attack squadrons and the stores ship USS Alstede. Beling was promoted to rear admiral in 1968.

== Forrestal fire ==
Captain Beling was commanding officer of USS Forrestal on July 29, 1967, when a Zuni rocket accidentally fired while on deck, striking another aircraft. In the initial moments of the disaster, which eventually killed 134 sailors and injured 167 more, including Lieutenant Commander and future U.S. Senator John McCain, Beling—who had been in his cabin at the time and was clad only in a t-shirt and uniform pants—ordered the ship slowed, to reduce the force of wind gusts blowing across the flight deck, and gave directions for incoming helicopters, sent to transport wounded sailors off Forrestal, to land at the front of the deck to keep rotor wash from fanning the flames. Beling would personally direct damage control efforts from the bridge throughout the ten-hour ordeal. As night fell, Beling recited a prayer to the surviving crew:

Our heavenly Father, we see this day as one minute and yet a lifetime for all of us. We thank you for the courage of those who gave their lives in saving their shipmates today. We humbly ask You to grant them peace and to their loved ones the consolation and strength to bear their loss. Help us to renew the faith we have in You. We thank You for our own lives. May we remember You as You have remembered us today. From our hearts we turn to You now, knowing that You have been at our side in every minute of this day. Heavenly Father, help us to rebuild and reman our ship, so that our brothers who died today may not have made a fruitless sacrifice.

— Captain John K. Beling, USN to his crew on 29 July 1967, The Captain's Prayer,

The subsequent Navy investigation absolved Beling of responsibility for the fire. While Forrestal was in the shipyard for repairs, Beling was temporarily assigned to work in the office of Admiral Thomas H. Moorer, then the Chief of Naval Operations. While there, he was sent for further temporary duty on the staff of Admiral Ephraim P. Holmes, Commander-in-Chief of the U.S. Atlantic Fleet; Holmes disagreed with many portions of the Navy's report into the Forrestal disaster, including the section clearing Beling, and had him assigned to his staff so he could issue a letter of reprimand, in essence both holding Beling responsible and ending his career. The reprimand was attached to the final report, and was subsequently rescinded by Admiral Holmes on direct orders from Admiral Moorer after the latter endorsed the report.

== Later career and death ==
Beling was promoted to rear admiral in 1968, and was given orders to command a carrier battle group out of San Diego. However, his orders were cancelled by Admiral Elmo R. Zumwalt, Moorer's successor as Chief of Naval Operations, who, in a move perceived as a way of holding him responsible for the Forrestal fire, instead sent him to Iceland, where he would retire as Commander, Iceland Defense Force, based at Naval Air Station Keflavik, Iceland.

He retired from active duty in 1973, at which time he went to work as director of the Net Technical Assessment Office, responsible for comparing and contrasting U.S. and Soviet weapons systems for the Secretary of Defense. In 1977, Beling joined the McLean, Virginia-based TRW, working as a strategic analyst directing studies until retiring again in 1985. After his final retirement, Beling took up farming, and served as director of the USS Forrestal Museum, a group dedicated to preserving the carrier, which was decommissioned in 1993, as a museum ship.

Admiral Beling died of complications from pneumonia at Reston Hospital Center in Reston, Virginia on November 5, 2010. He was 91 years old. He was survived by his wife of sixty years, Evelyn Beling, who died in 2011; three children; and seven grandchildren. He and his wife are buried in Section 46 of Arlington National Cemetery.

== Awards and decorations ==
Rear Admiral Beling received a number of personal awards, as well as campaign medals from World War II to Vietnam:

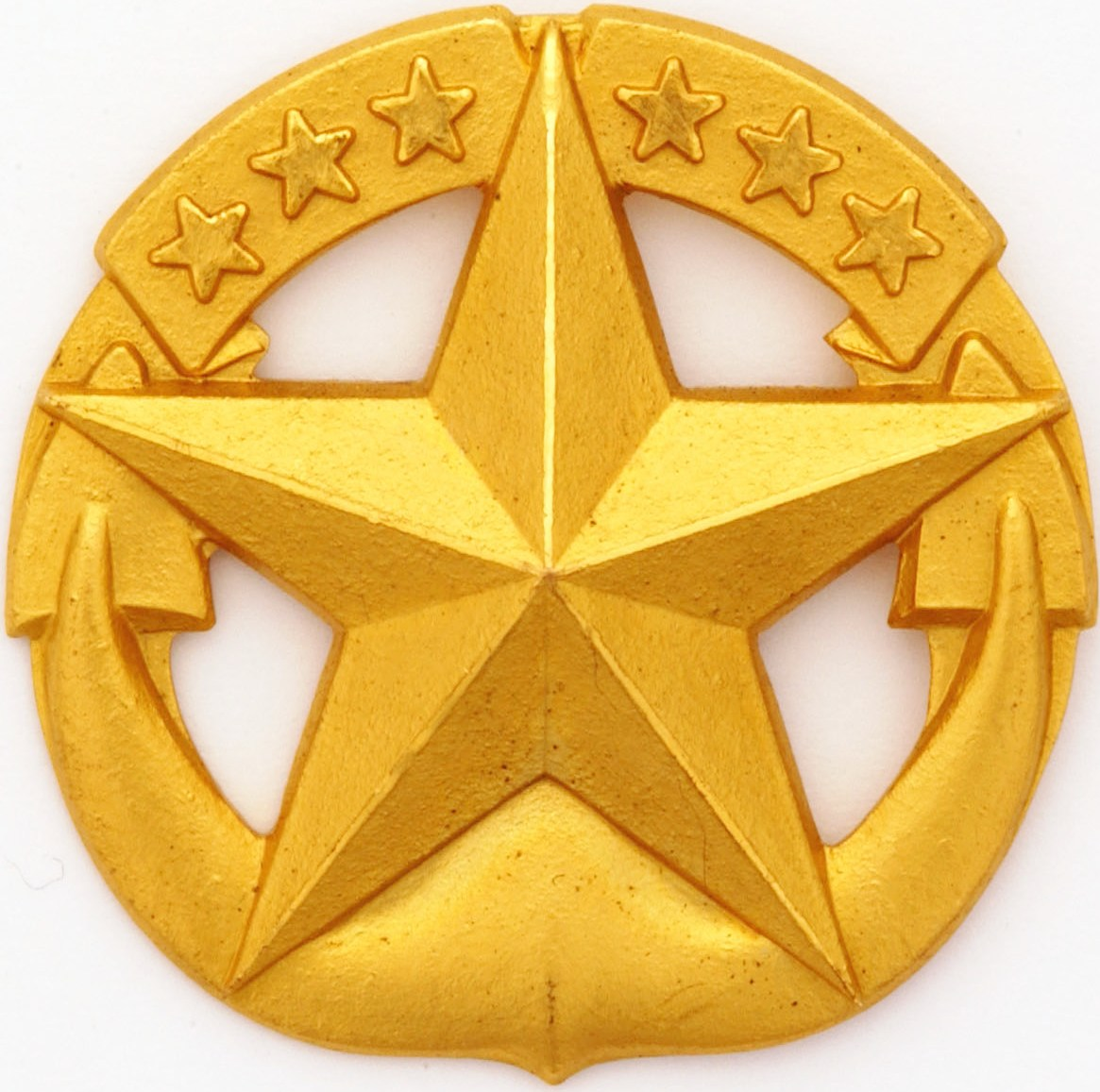

Naval Aviator Insignia
Legion of Merit with star	Distinguished Flying Cross	Purple Heart
Air Medal with two stars	Presidential Unit Citation with star	American Defense Service Medal
American Campaign Medal	Asiatic-Pacific Campaign Medal with star	World War II Victory Medal
National Defense Service Medal with star	Vietnam Service Medal with star	Commander's Cross with Star of the Order of the Falcon (Iceland)
Command at Sea Insignia
