= 1966 USS Oriskany fire =

Fire on a US aircraft carrier

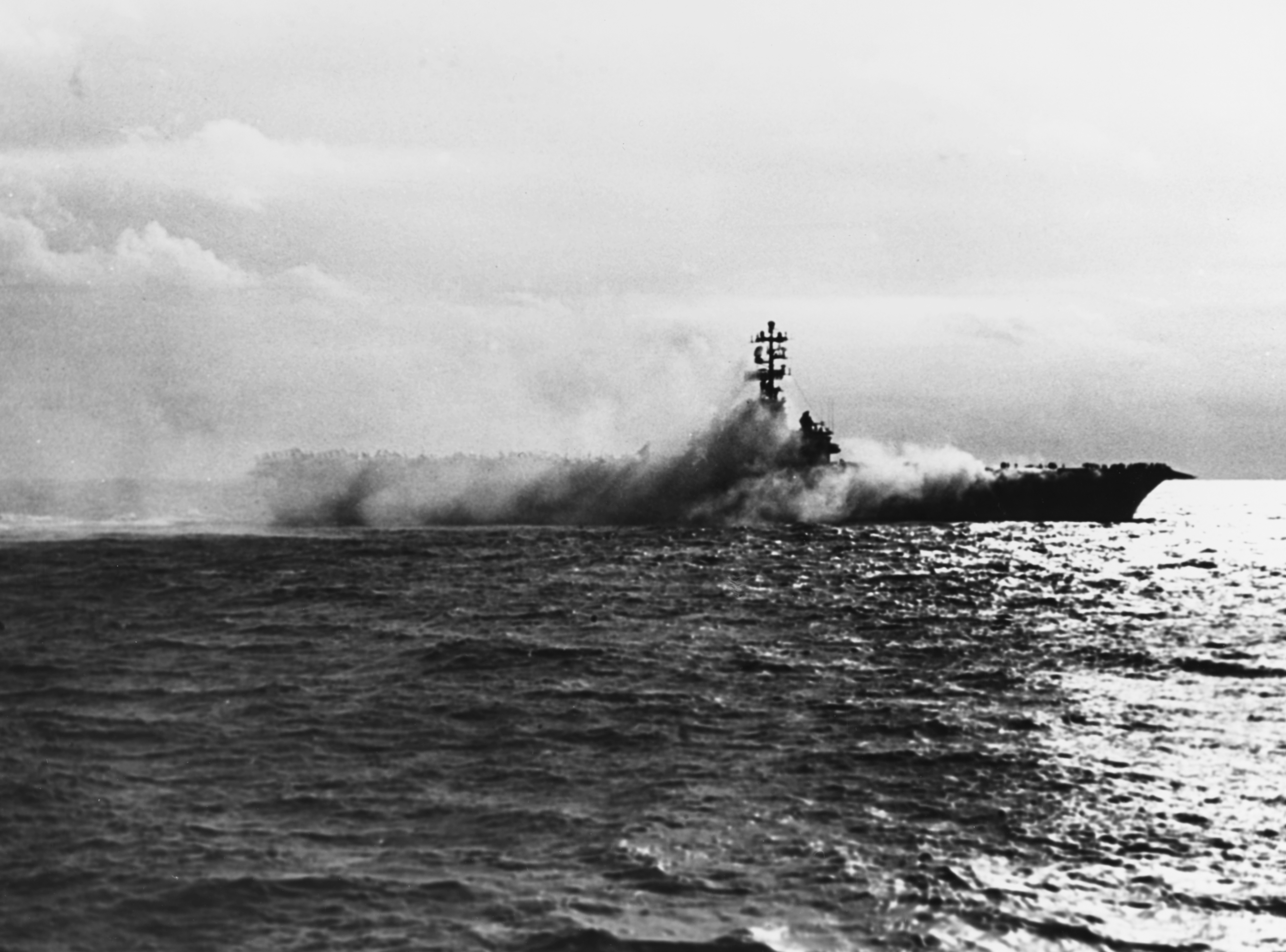
- Smoke visible from the burning USS Oriskany in the Gulf of Tonkin, 26 October 1966
- Date: October 26, 1966
- Time: About 7:28 a.m. local time
- Location: Gulf of Tonkin
- Casualties: 44 dead & 3 aircraft destroyed 156 injured & 3 aircraft damaged

On October 26, 1966, a major fire broke out aboard the Essex-class aircraft carrier USS Oriskany as a result of a lit flare being locked inside a flare locker. The ensuing inferno killed 44 people, mostly air crew, and injured 156 others. It was the first of three major fires to befall American carriers during the Vietnam War.

== Background ==
Oriskany departed San Diego for her second Vietnam deployment, and third wartime deployment, on 26 May 1966. The carrier arrived on station off the coast of Vietnam a few weeks later, and commenced operations in support of operations in Vietnam.

== Sequence of events ==
On October 26, 1966 at approximately 0728 hours local time, as Oriskany was preparing to begin flight operations and stowing ordnance from night operations, an alarm was sounded for a fire in compartment A-107-M, a flare locker, containing over 250 MK-24 magnesium flares, located just off the forward hangar deck, adjacent to the Starboard sponson. A flare had accidentally been actuated, and the sailor handling the flare had thrown it into the locker and dogged the door shut. Hundreds of these 24 lb. flares were stored here and were about to be ignited, burning at 3000 degrees.

To complicate the situation further, the Oriskany had begun an underway replenishment (UNREP) taking on black oil, JP5, and avgas from the USS Hassayampa (AO-145) on its starboard side, one of three super tankers in its class capable of UNREP speed that allowed flight ops to continue. Hoses were connected between the two ships and fuel transfer had begun. The Oriskany sounded general quarters and initiated an emergency breakaway from the Hassayampa, dropping hoses into the sea between the two ships to let it pull away to port. The situation on both ships became chaotic with the Hassayampa attempting to recover heavy rubber hoses dragging alongside before they could do damage to the crane systems supporting the hoses during an UNREP.

Firefighting teams aboard the Oriskany began to attempt to cool the area near the burning locker; because the high pressure within the locker made it impossible to open the locker door, fighting the fire directly was impossible. About 10 minutes into the fire, the pressure became so great that the doors blew out, igniting a helicopter located on the port side forward of the hangar deck. With the ship headed into the wind, getting ready to launch aircraft, the heat and smoke were drawn forward into the berthing quarters located forward of the hangar bay.

Other sailors in the area worked to move aircraft, many of which were bomb and fuel laden, from the hangar to the flight deck to prevent them from catching fire. On deck six, in a pump room servicing the forward elevator, the sailor on duty attempted to close the large air vents servicing the compartment, which were starting to blow smoke in; unable to do so, he used wet rags to protect himself. Closer to the fire, sailors began attempting to evacuate "officers' country", a series of staterooms occupied largely by pilots assigned to Oriskany's air wing.

Within five minutes, an explosion occurred in the flare locker, the result of multiple flares igniting at once. Aircraft in the hangar bay caught fire, and nearby sailors attempting to cool the area were burned. Down in officers' country, several men were killed when a fireball shot down the passageway, burning their lungs. Other personnel suffocated to death in the passageways. On the flight deck, firefighting crews worked feverishly to cool the steel deck, while other flight deck personnel began pushing ordnance off the flight deck. Down in the hangar, the aircraft that caught fire were pushed over the side, along with ordnance that was staged in the hangar from an earlier replenishment. Sailors aboard Hassayampa watched in horror while slowly pulling away to starboard still recovering hoses dragging in the sea.

Aboard Oriskany, a pilot trapped in his stateroom found a wrench and opened the porthole. With items in his room catching fire, the pilot continually wrapped himself in wet sheets or blankets, and kept his head out the porthole; as the sheets or blankets began to smolder, the pilot would wet the items down again, wrap himself up, and return to the porthole. Unable to escape due to the fire outside his room, the pilot kept this up for some time. Finally, an enlisted sailor discovered his plight and supplied him with a firehose, a battle lantern, and an Oxygen Breathing Apparatus; for the duration of the fire, the pilot used the hose to fight the fire and cool his stateroom, and keep the fire from spreading again into the room. Nearby, the executive officer of the air wing's Crusader squadron, finding himself in a similar situation, stripped naked and forced his way through his porthole. He obtained a firefighting suit, and later helped the ship's fire marshal in organizing firefighting parties.

In the elevator pump room, the fireman on duty attempted to request assistance from his supervisor. Frustrated over the lack of progress, the sailor tried to find out if there was something keeping help from reaching him, and discovered that a large amount of water from the firefighting efforts had settled over the hatch. He opened the hatch in an attempt to save himself, partially flooding the compartment in the process. Trapped by water and smoke, the fireman continued to try to keep himself safe until his supervisor and the ship's ordnance officer, a qualified Navy diver who happened to find scuba gear, entered the compartment and rescued him. Coincidentally, the scuba gear belonged to the trapped sailor.

Near the pump room, several officers and enlisted men took refuge in a void extending from below the hangar to a deck below the pump room. One officer had been badly burned, and a second was knocked unconscious after nearly falling off a ladder inside the void. After breaking the padlocks off the storage spaces inside the void to release the usable air inside those spaces, the officers and men began to wait the fire out in the void. Eventually, though, they tried to make their way to safety. One of the enlisted men left the void to seek out an OBA, and found a pair of stretcher bearers to help carry out the injured officers. Working through some initial difficulties, the officers and men eventually made their way to safety.

At approximately 1030 hours, the ship's fire marshal, who had been leading firefighting operations on the hangar deck, informed Damage Control Central that the fire was under control. The last of the smaller fires was extinguished around five hours later. Unable to remain on station, Oriskany set course for the Naval station at Subic Bay in the Philippines.

During the fire, some of the injured were flown from Oriskany to USS Constellation (CV-64).

== Aftermath ==
Forty-three men died in the fire; one died shortly afterwards. Two days after the fire, a memorial service was held aboard Oriskany for those killed in the fire. After offloading her fallen and undergoing repair in Subic Bay, the ship returned to San Francisco's Hunters Point Naval Shipyard for more extensive repairs. The ship returned to service the following year, undergoing training before returning to Yankee Station. Several sailors, including the Chief Ordnance Officer, were court-martialed and charged with 44 counts of manslaughter for their actions immediately prior to the fire; however, all were acquitted. A Navy investigation determined that magnesium flares, such as those involved in the fire, could ignite when jarred in certain cases; this is believed to be what caused the flare to initially ignite.

The fire aboard Oriskany would be the first of three major fires aboard American carriers in the latter half of the 1960s. A fire aboard USS Forrestal on July 29, 1967 killed 134 sailors and injured 161, and a fire aboard USS Enterprise on January 15, 1969, killed 28 sailors and injured 314.

=== Fatalities ===
The officers and enlisted men who died aboard Oriskany are:

Ship's Company

Name	Rank/Rate	Age	Hometown
Dewey L. Alexander	LTJG	39	Houston, TX
Ramon A. Copple	LTJG	35	Shreveport, LA
Richard E. Donahue	CDR	37	Centerville, IA
Robert L. Dyke	JOSN	22	Alamo, CA
Frank M. Gardner	LT	43	Cranston, RI
William J. Garrity Jr.	LCDR	40	Havre, MT
James K. Gray	SN	22	Happy, TX
Jack H. Harris	CDR	40	Schofield, WI
Greg E. Hart	AA	17	Seattle, WA
James B. Hudis	LTJG	25	Brookfield, WI
Harry W. Juntilla (1)	CDR	42	Minneapolis, MN
James A. Kelly Jr.	LTJG	25	Phoenixville, PA
James A. Lee	SN	20	Globe, AZ
Walter F. Merrick	LCDR	46	Bangor, ME
Donald W. Shanks	BM3	25	Crescent City, CA
Franklin M. Tunick	LTJG	25	Linden, NJ
William Walling	FN	20	Blue Island, IL

(1)Died October 31, 1966

Carrier Air Wing 16 Staff

Name	Rank/Rate	Age	Hometown
Rodney B. Carter	CDR	40	Porterville, CA
Lloyd P. Hyde	LT	28	Atlanta, GA

VAW-11

Name	Rank/Rate	Age	Hometown
William R. Clements	LTJG	26	Hayward, CA

VAH-4

Name	Rank/Rate	Age	Hometown
George K. Farris	CDR	35	Portland, IN
John F. Francis	LT	33	Weston, ON
James A. Smith	LCDR	31	Kansas City, MO

VA-25

Name	Rank/Rate	Age	Hometown
Omar R. Ford	LCDR	32	Cambridge, NE

VA-152

Name	Rank/Rate	Age	Hometown
David A. Liste	AZAN	26	Lake Charles, LA
John J. Nussbaumer	CDR	38	Vancouver, WA

VA-163

Name	Rank/Rate	Age	Hometown
Clarence D. Miller	LT	30	Frostburg, MD
Clement J. Morisette	LCDR	33	Othello, WA
Thomas E. Spitzer	LTJG	25	Baldwin, ND
Ronald E. Tardio	ENS	23	Cochabamba, BO

VA-164

Name	Rank/Rate	Age	Hometown
James L. Brewer	LTJG	24	Memphis, TN
William A. Johnson	LTJG	25	Charlotte, NC
Daniel L. Strong	LCDR	29	Big Bear City, CA
Clyde R. Welch	CDR	38	Somerville, TX

VF-111

Name	Rank/Rate	Age	Hometown
Cody A. Balisteri	LTJG	25	Sheffield Lake, OH
Norman S. Levy	LCDR	31	Forest Hills, NY
William G. McWilliams III	LTJG	24	Norfolk, VA

VF-162

Name	Rank/Rate	Age	Hometown
Charles W. Boggs	ENS	23	Minneapolis, MN

HC-1

Name	Rank/Rate	Age	Hometown
Josslyn F. Blakely, Jr.	LT	26	Montevallo, AL
Julian D. Hammond	LT	32	Meridian, MS
Daniel O. Kern	ENS	23	Whitesboro, NY
Gerald W. Siebe	LTJG	25	Mascoutah, IL
James R. Welsh	LTJG	27	Stroudsburg, PA

=== Memorials ===
A memorial was crafted around the ship's anchor after the ship was decommissioned in 1976, with plaques that represent the 44 deceased victims of the fire.
