= Jack-in-the-box effect =

Type of tank catastrophic kill

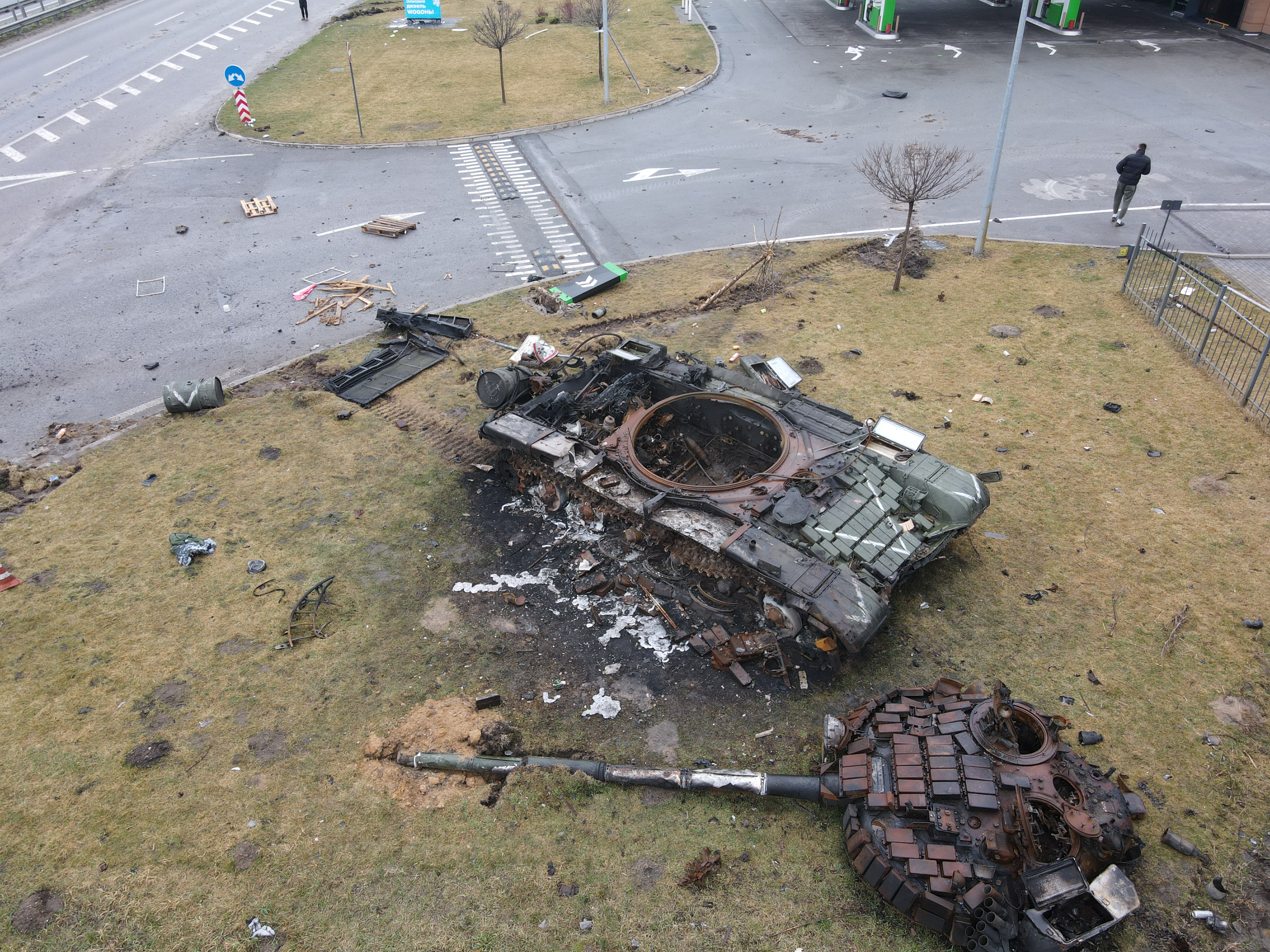
T-72 destroyed in Ukraine

The jack-in-the-box effect, also known as a turret toss, is a specific effect of a catastrophic kill on a warship, tank or other turreted armored vehicle in which an ammunition explosion causes the tank's turret to be violently blown off the chassis and into the air. It is named after the child's toy, the jack-in-the-box, in which a puppet pops up.

== Mechanics ==
If an anti-tank projectile or shaped-charge blast manages to penetrate a turreted armored vehicle's hull and subsequently its ammunition storage area, the shock wave or heat and pressure can be sufficient to cause cooking off or sympathetic detonation of the tank's unfired explosive shells and propellant. This causes a massive and instantaneous overpressure in the sealed internal compartment of the tank, which is released by exploding outwards through the weakest point in the otherwise homogeneous compartment, namely, the turret ring. This blows the turret completely off the chassis and into the air in a gush of flame. The same effect often took place in naval warfare (see loss of Roma battleship)

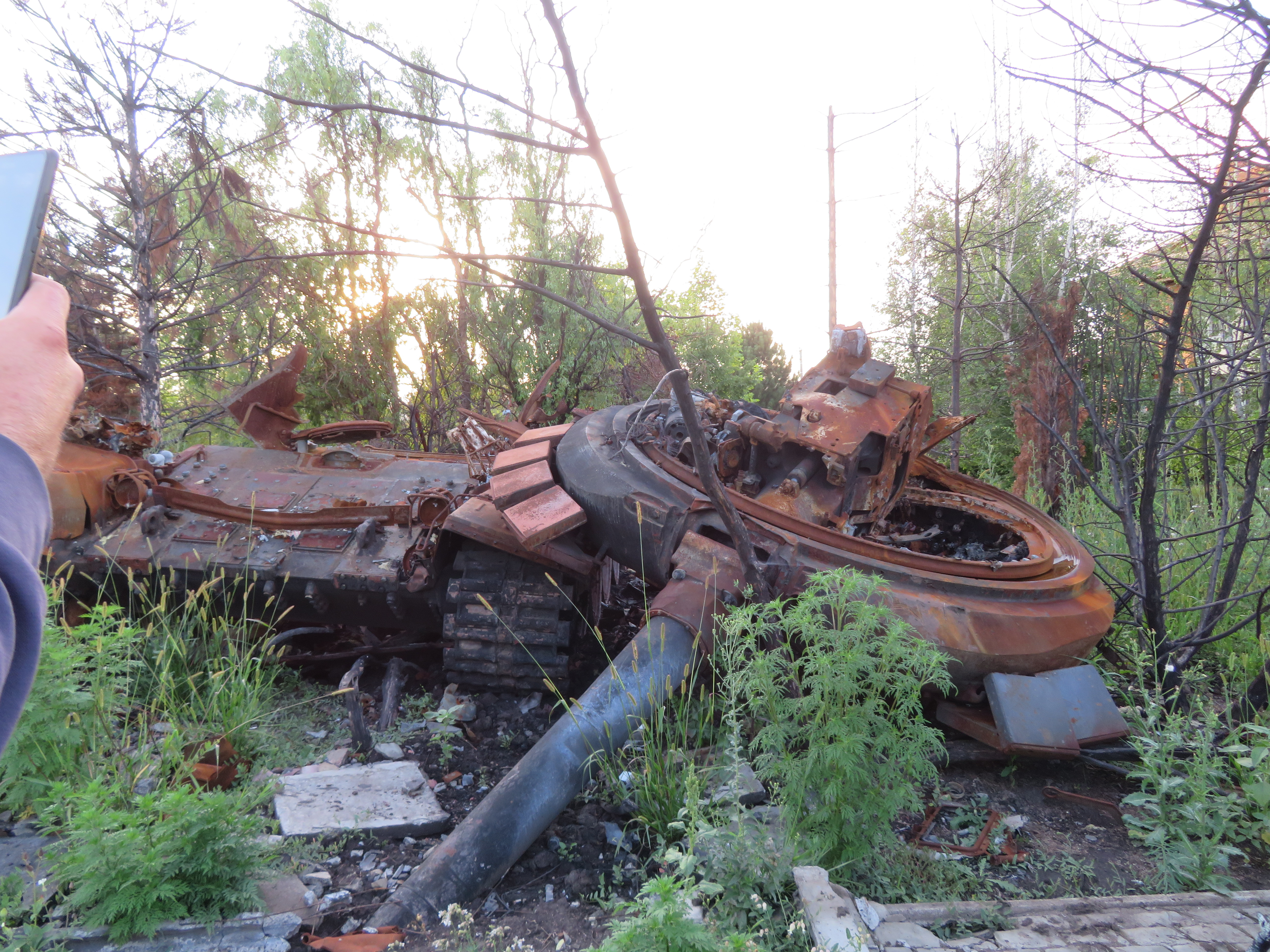
Destroyed T-72B3 in Ukraine with the turret separated

The jack-in-the-box effect is known to occur in tanks which are "buttoned up" (i.e. with all hatches closed and locked), and which have internally stored ammunition and no blowout panels on the ammunition storage area. Tanks of the World War II era were frequently seen to have lost their turrets in this manner, largely owing to the design of that era, as at the time the need for special shielding of the tank's ammunition storage compartments was not recognized.

Some 1970s tanks, such as the Russian designed T-72 family of tanks use a carousel autoloader, which stores ammunition in a ring around the inside of the turret next to the crew. This reduces the size and weight of the autoloader and allows for more loaded ammunition. This, in turn, reduces the silhouette and size of the tank and makes it easier to armor and harder to spot. A smaller tank keeps the cost down, and could be transported by truck or rail easily. However, any hits that penetrate and hit this ring of ammo will likely cause an explosion and total loss of the crew and vehicle. Newer Russian tanks such as the T-90 are still susceptible to this effect. However, contrary to popular belief, the flaw is mostly related to the spare ammunition in the turret, outside of the autoloader. The autoloaders have some ballistic protection, but only hold roughly half of a T-72/80’s ammunition. During the first and second Chechen war, the Russians were able to reduce their losses by having their tanks carry fewer rounds so that all the ammunition and propellant was stored in the autoloaders. The latest variant of the T-90M has been designed with some of the spare ammo in an external storage, which reduces the likelihood, but does not completely eliminate the risk.

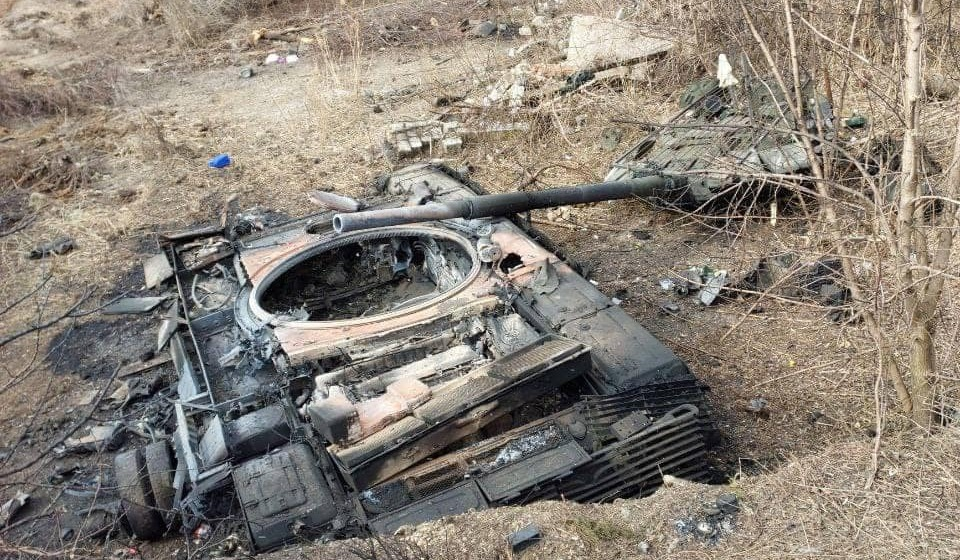
A destroyed Russian tank, with the turret to the right showing the results of the jack-in-the-box effect

Many modern Western tanks (for instance, the M1 Abrams, Leopard 2, and Leclerc) feature ammunition compartments designed to fail safely under fire, reducing damage to the level of a firepower kill. In such designs, when the tank is damaged, blowout panels open to channel ignited propellants and explosives away from the crew cabin. While the M1 Abrams and Leopard 2 tanks accomplish this through the use of a human loader, the Leclerc uses a more sophisticated autoloading system that allows storing of ammunition outside of the main turret compartment, coming at the cost of greater weight and lower ammunition capacity. Training doctrine mandates that the ammunition compartment door must be closed before loading the main gun, exposing the crew to only one shell at a time. Whether an enemy hit ruptures the ammunition compartment or penetrates the tank's interior, the crew has a higher chance of survival, so they are more likely to return the tank to a maintenance center or at least escape their disabled vehicle.

Western tanks, however, are not invulnerable from these sorts of catastrophic hazards. Keeping the ammunition in the rear turret (such as the M1 Abrams or Leopard 2) bustle means any penetration of the front of the turret that makes it right through will hit the ammunition in the rear of the turret and set it off. Blow-out panels are good for burning propellent, but useless for detonating high-explosive ammunition. On the other hand, with the ammunition storage in the rear, the turret on these tanks are enormous, which makes it a big target. Hitting the rear turret of a tank is not difficult, especially with ATGM, UAV or RPG-based weaponry. The larger turret on the Western tanks contributes to that additional weight, which has implications for manufacturing costs, ease of transportation, fuel consumption and mobility. On 4 September 2023, a video emerged from Robotyne which showed the first combat loss of a Challenger 2 tank. A 9M133 Kornet missile triggered a fire that apparently cooked off the Challenger 2's ammunition charges, and the resulting blast wrenched the Challenger 2's turret from its hull.

In the Turkish intervention in Syria, images and videos depicting several completely destroyed Leopard 2A4's, some with their turrets blown off, were published in January 2017. The 'turret tossing' effect was potentially caused by the Leopard 2's design, with not all of the ammo being stored in blow-out panel compartments.

== Bibliography ==
- The Eve of Destruction: The Untold Story of the Yom Kippur War, Howard Blum, Harper Perennial, 2004
- Tanks of World War II; Jane's Information Group, HarperResource, 1995
- Jane's Tank Recognition Guide, Christopher F. Foss and Jane's Information Group, Harper-Collins Publishers, 2003
