= Anti-tank warfare =

Military tactics against tanks

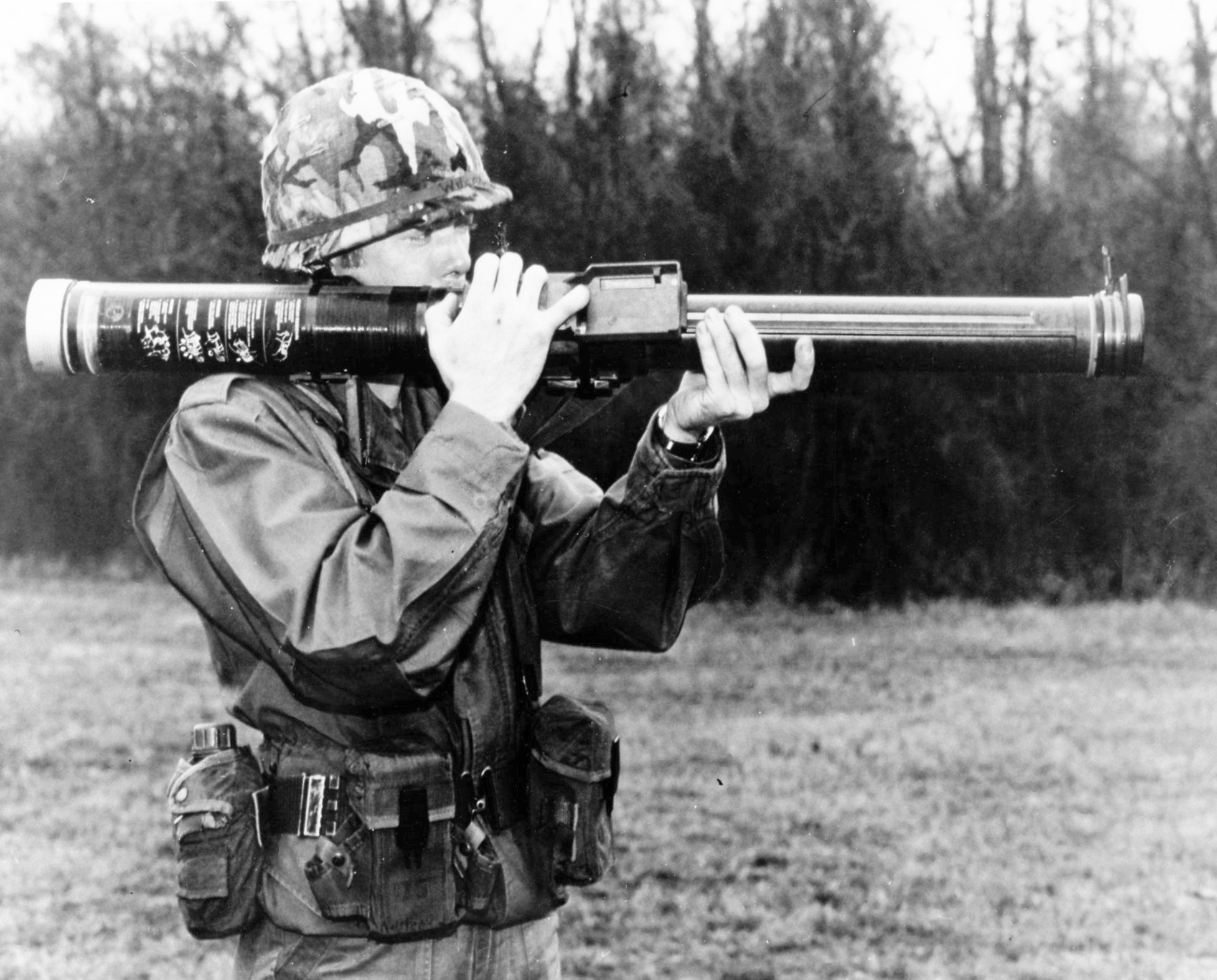
A soldier preparing to fire the FGR-17 Viper, an American experimental one-person disposable anti-tank rocket launcher

Anti-tank warfare refers to military strategies, tactics and weapon systems designed to counter and destroy armoured vehicles such as tanks. Originating from the first deployment of tanks in 1916, it has since become a fundamental component of wartime strategy and doctrine. Across the 20th century, anti-tank warfare has rapidly evolved, from anti-tank guns to guided missiles and in more modern times, improvised explosive devices (IEDs), drones and loitering munitions.

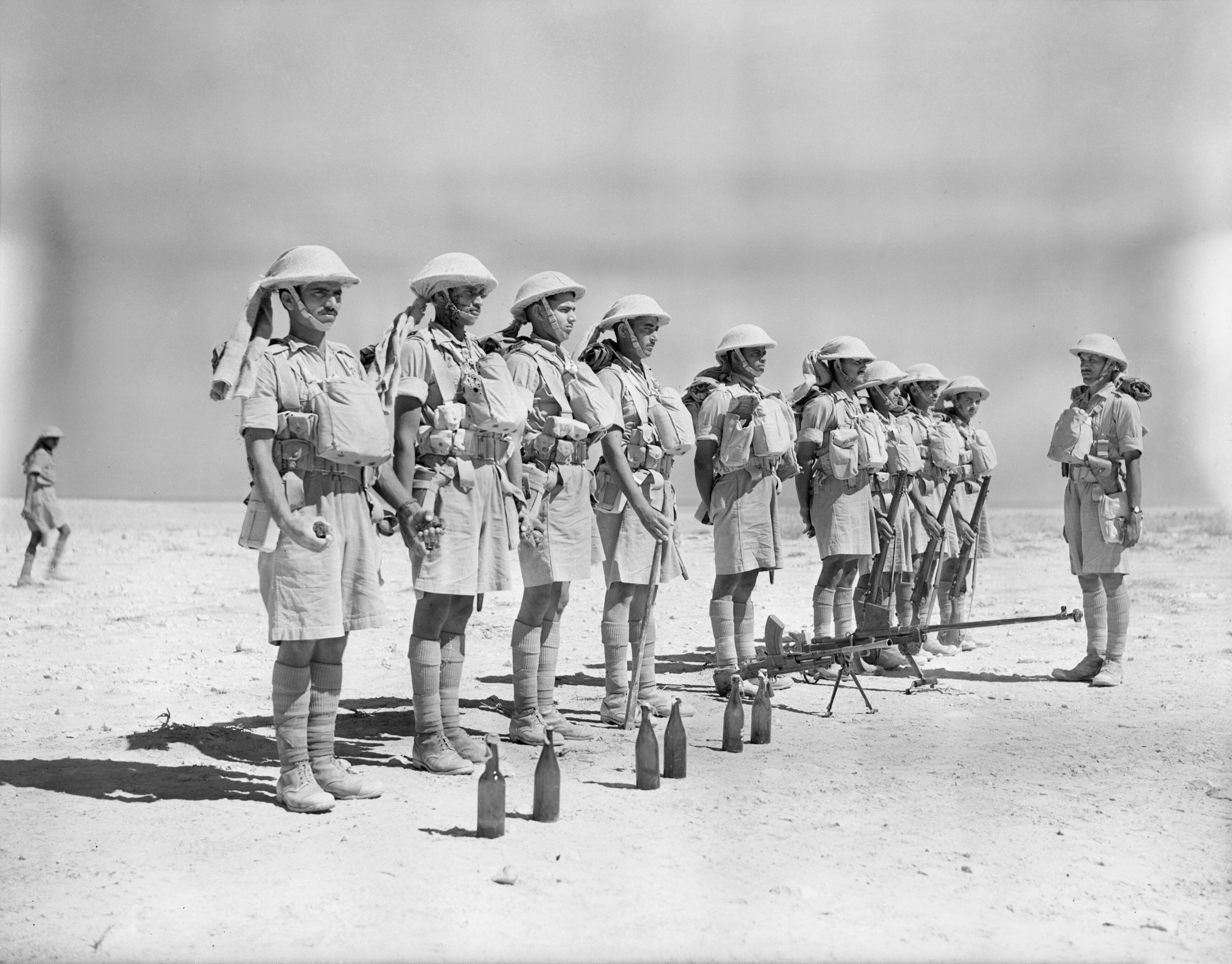
British Indian Army tank-hunting squad with anti-tank rifle and Molotov cocktails in North Africa, 6 October 1940

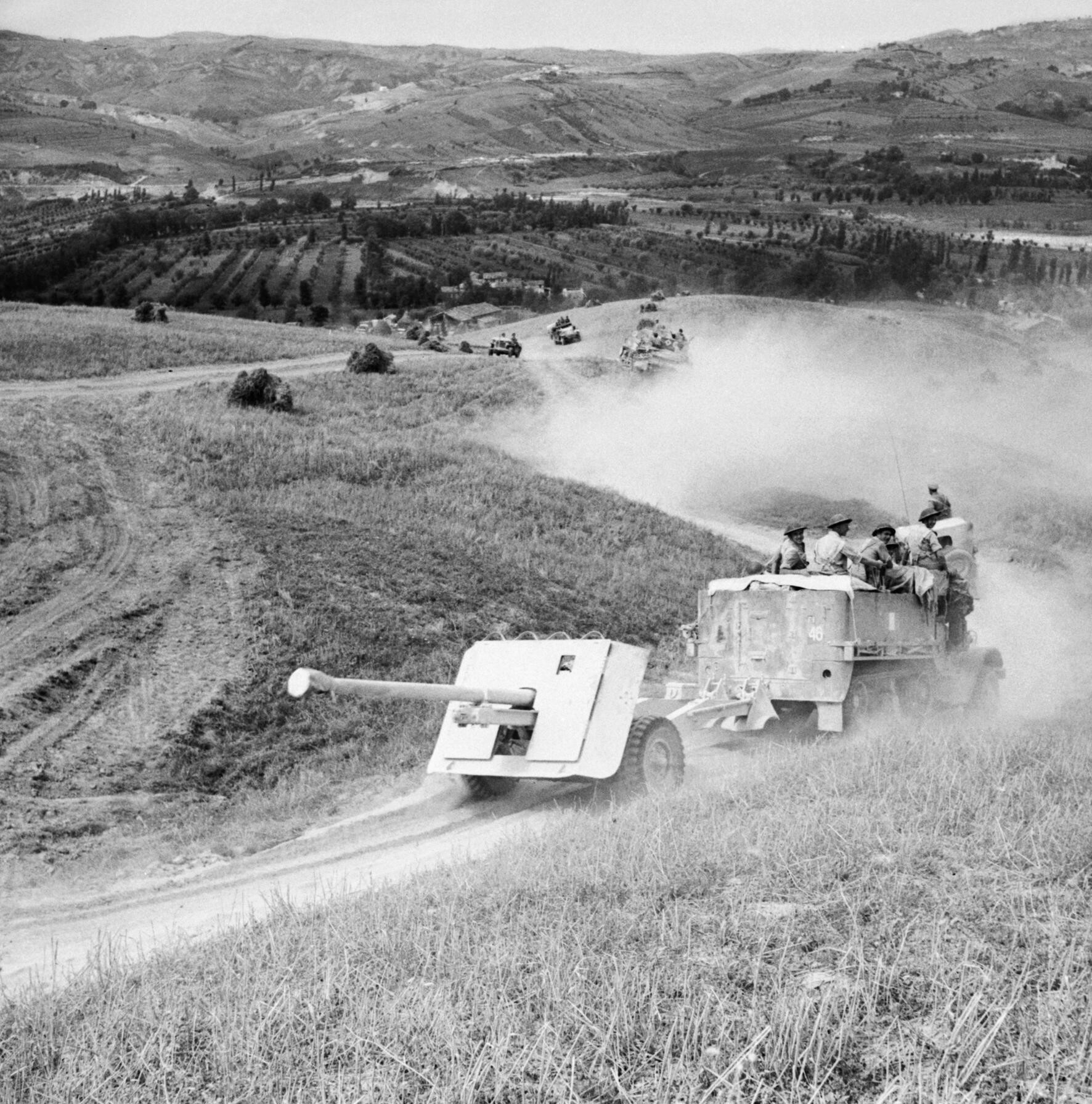
A British 17-pounder anti-tank gun towed behind half-track in Italy, 1 September 1944

== Tank threat ==
Anti-tank warfare evolved as a countermeasure to the threat of the tank's appearance on the battlefields of the Western Front of the First World War. The tank had been developed to negate the German system of trenches, and allow a return to maneuver against enemy's flanks and to attack the rear with cavalry.

The use of the tank was mainly based on the assumption that, once they were able to eliminate the German trench lines with their machine gun and infantry support gun positions, the Allied infantry would follow and secure the breach, and the cavalry would exploit the breach in the trench lines by attacking into the depth of German-held territory, eventually capturing the field artillery positions and interdicting logistics and reserves being brought up from the rear areas. Naval crews initially used to operate the installed naval guns and machine guns were replaced with Army personnel who were more aware of the infantry tactics with which the tanks were intended to cooperate. However, there was no means of communication between the tank's crew and the accompanying infantry, or between the tanks participating in combat. Radios were not yet portable or robust enough to be mounted in a tank, although Morse Code transmitters were installed in some Mark IVs at Cambrai as messaging vehicles. Attaching a field telephone to the rear would become a practice only during the next war. With greater use of tanks by both sides, it was realized that the accompanying infantry could be forced to ground by ambush fire, thus separating them from the tanks, which would continue to advance, eventually finding themselves exposed to close-assaults by German infantry and sappers.

The early tanks were mechanically rudimentary. The 6-to-12-millimetre (0.24 to 0.47 in) thick armor generally prevented penetration by small arms fire and shell fragments. However, even a near miss from field artillery or an impact from a mortar could easily disable or destroy the tank: if the fuel tank were ruptured, it could incinerate the tank's crew. A large-caliber gun was recognized as a tactical necessity for attacking machine-gun positions and defeating any infantry field pieces found in the trench lines, which could easily disable tank track with HE ammunition. This was achieved by mounting a 57 mm QF 6 pounder Hotchkiss light naval gun in the hull barbettes. Hull and track engineering was largely dictated by the terrain—the need to cross wide trenches—although the relationship between ground pressure and soil-vehicle mechanics was not resolved until the Second World War. Turrets were later introduced on medium and light tanks to react to ambushes during the advance.

== First World War ==
The tank, when it appeared on the Western Front in September 1916, was a surprise to German troops, but not the German General Staff. The French Army Staff was highly critical of the British Army's early fielding of the Mark I tanks in small numbers, as French trials had shown the armored vehicles to be highly unreliable. They judged that large numbers had to be employed to sustain an offensive despite losses to mechanical failure or vehicles foundering in intractable no man's land terrain. These losses, coupled with those from enemy artillery fire, later amounted to as high as 70% of the starters during some operations. Deploying small numbers of tanks would therefore cause the Allies to lose the element of surprise, allowing the Germans to develop countermeasures.

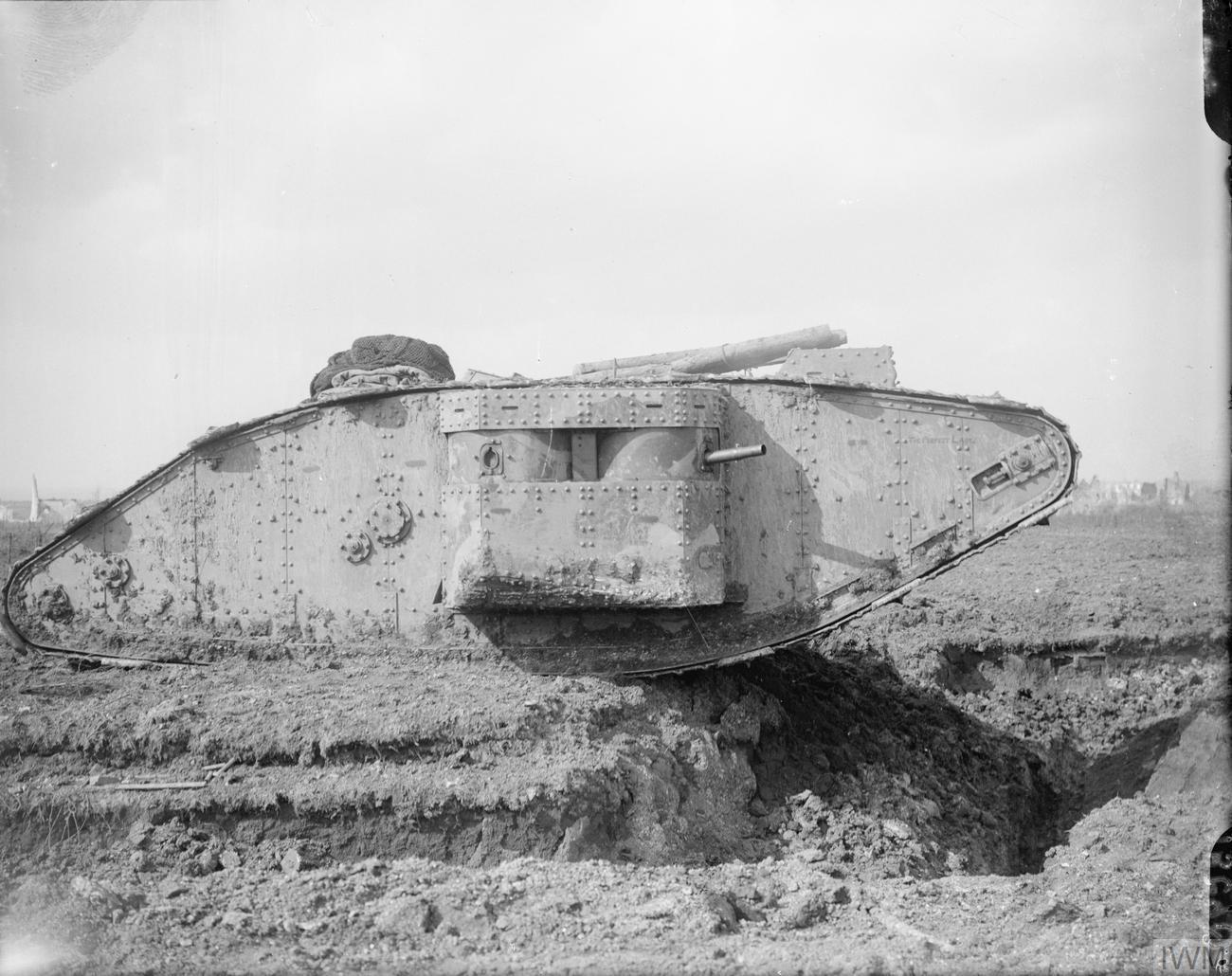
A British heavy tank of World War One

=== Anti-tank weapons ===
Because the German Army was the only force in need of anti-tank weapons, it was the first to develop viable technology to combat armored vehicles. These technologies took three ammunition approaches: use of grenades by infantrymen, including the Geballte Ladung ("Bundled Charge") of several stick grenades bound together by pioneers; early attempts at the small-caliber anti-tank rifles like the bolt-action 13 mm Mauser 1918 T-Gewehr; 3.7 cm TaK Rheinmetall in starrer Räder-lafette 1916 anti-tank gun on a light carriage which could destroy a tank using large-caliber armor-piercing ammunition issued in 1917 to special commands; and the existing 77 mm field guns (such as the 7.7 cm FK 16) of the infantry division's artillery regiment were also eventually issued with special armor-piercing (AP) ammunition.

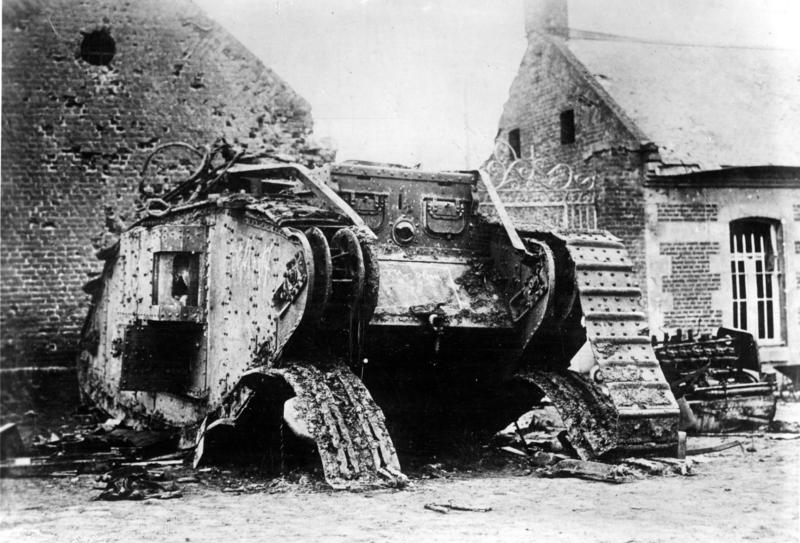
A disabled Mark IV tank near Cambrai, 1917 – World War I

=== Anti-tank tactics ===
With the appearance of Allied tanks, the German Army quickly introduced new anti-tank defense detachments within the pioneer battalions of the infantry divisions. These were initially issued as 13 mm-caliber, long-barreled rifles firing solid shot. However, these suffered from fouling after 2–3 rounds and had a recoil that was unsustainable by the mechanism or the rifleman. Stick grenades were used to destroy the tracks by individual pioneers; this required accompanying machine-gunners to first separate the supporting Allied infantry line from the tanks, a task that proved difficult. Another tactic was to lure the tank beyond the German trench line, then re-establish it just as the Allied infantry approached. The divisional 7.7 cm guns brought forward would then engage the tank, attempting to disable its tracks with standard HE shells (and later AP ammunition). If the crews of the disabled tanks refused to surrender, they were engaged with flamethrowers, or a mortar would be fired on the stricken vehicle until a direct hit was achieved on the top surface, usually resulting in an internal fire. Finally, anti-tank obstacles were prepared on the likely approaches by deepening and widening existing ground cratering, the precursors of the anti-tank trench. Finally, in early 1917, the 3.7 cm TaK from Rheinmetall was rushed to the frontline and proved effective at destroying tanks despite its limited elevation and traverse.

== Development between the world wars ==
The lack of consensus on the tank's design and use after the First World War also influenced the development of anti-tank countermeasures. However, because Germany was restricted by the Treaty of Versailles in its military capability, and there were no other challenges to France and Britain, very little development took place in anti-tank warfare until the 1930s.

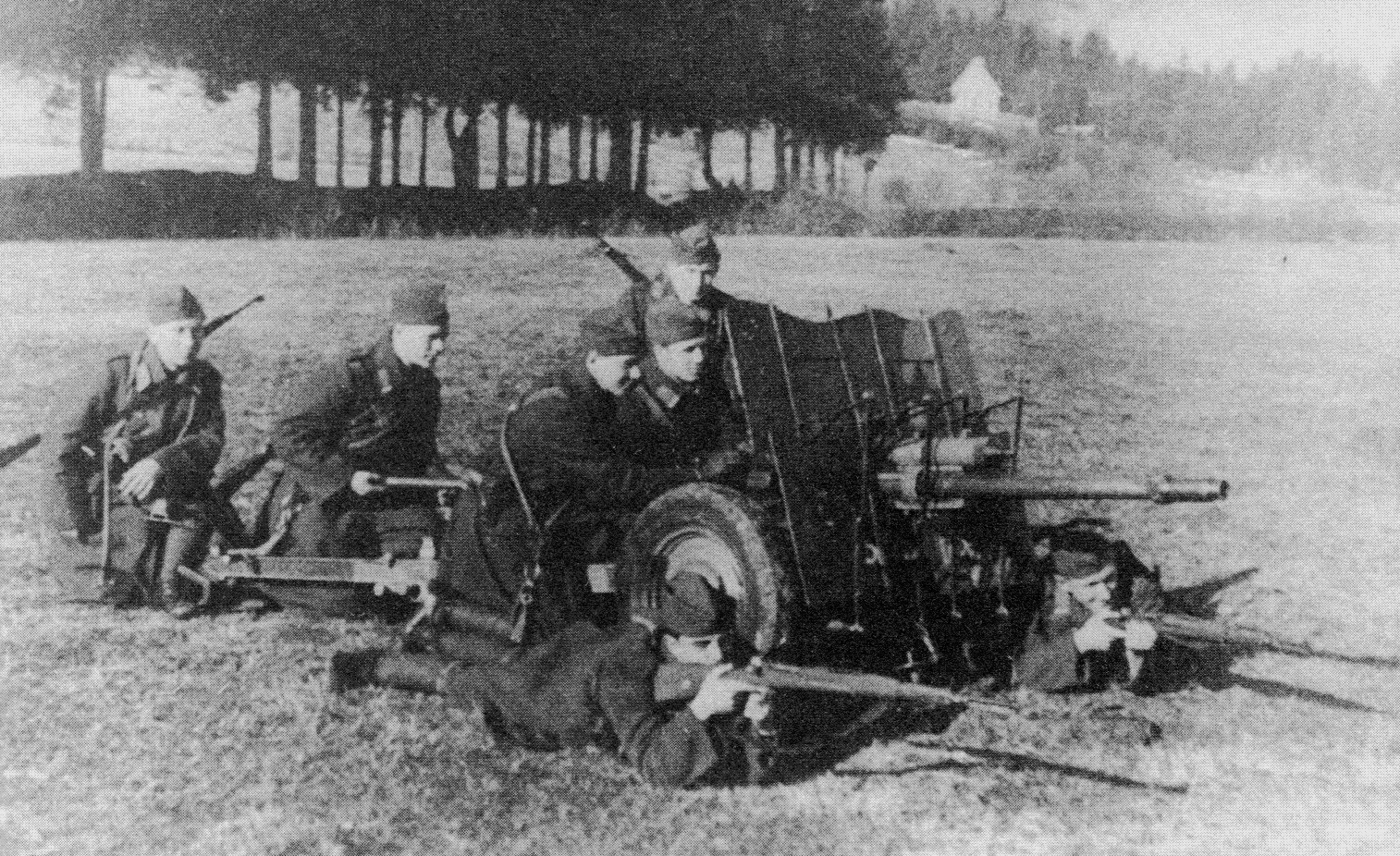
Czechoslovak anti-tank gun 3,7cm KPÚV vz. 37 .

The Interwar period was dominated by strategic thinking with fortified borders at its core. These included obstacles consisting of natural features such as ditches, streams and urban areas, or constructed obstacles such as anti-tank ditches, minefields, dragon's teeth, or log barriers. The pinnacle of this strategic thinking was considered to be the Maginot Line which replaced infantry-filled trenches with artillery-filled bunkers, including casemates housing 37 or 47 mm anti-tank guns, and steel turrets armed with a pair of machine guns and a 25 mm anti-tank gun, although Germany was forbidden to produce tanks. The construction was partially based on the Allied experience with the Hindenburg Line, which was breached with tank support during the battles of Cambrai and St. Quentin Canal, although German Command was more impressed by the surprise achieved by the Canadian troops at the Battle of the Canal du Nord. This influenced their planning in 1940.

The Maginot line defenses – up to 25 km (16 mi) deep from the forward positions to the rear line – were intended to prevent a surprise attack and delay any attack while the French Army was mobilized. Given the relative numerical inferiority of France compared to Germany, it was a more effective use of human resources. Within the line, passive anti-tank obstacles were supported by anti-infantry and anti-tank bunkers. After Belgium declared neutrality in 1936, France began work on extending the line along the Belgian border.

Improved artillery was seen as the quickest solution to anti-tank defense, and one of the earliest post-war designs was the French 25 mm Hotchkiss anti-tank gun. It was intended to replace an Atelier de Puteaux 37 mm weapon designed in 1916 to destroy machine gun positions. Rheinmetall commenced design of a 37 mm anti-tank gun in 1924 and the first guns were produced in 1928 as 3.7 cm Pak L/45, later adopted in Wehrmacht service as 3.7 cm Pak 36. It made an appearance during the Spanish Civil War, as did the Bofors 37 mm developed in Sweden, and used by many early Second World War combatants. The British Army accepted for service the (40 mm) Ordnance QF 2 pounder, which was developed as a tank gun. The Soviet Red Army after the Russian Civil War also begun a search for an anti-tank gun with a French Hotchkiss 37 mm L.33 tank gun, but soon upgraded this to a higher velocity L.45 Model 1935 while also making a licensed copy of the German 3.7 cm PaK 36. However, the Red Army was taught a lesson in anti-tank warfare almost immediately when a tank battalion sent to aid the Spanish Republicans in the Spanish Civil War was almost destroyed in an engagement.

At this time, the predominant ammunition used against tanks was the armor-piercing kinetic energy shell that defeated armor by direct pressure, spiking or punching through it. During the late 1930s, shaped charge ammunition was experimented with, using chemical energy to penetrate armor. The shaped charge concept is officially known as the "Munroe Effect" and was discovered by accident decades earlier by Professor Charles E. Munroe at the U.S. Torpedo Station, Providence, RI. Professor Munroe was detonating different manufactured blocks of explosives on a sheet of armor plating and observed the blocks having the manufacturing

letters recessed (vs. raised) cut an imprint of the manufacturing letters into the armor plate—the birth of the shaped-charged explosive, which focuses the blast energy caused by an indentation on the surface area of an explosive. Although shaped charges are somewhat more difficult to manufacture, the advantage is that the projectile does not require as high velocity as typical kinetic energy shells, yet on impact it creates a high-velocity jet of metal flowing like a liquid due to the immense pressure (though x-ray diffraction has shown the metal stays solid) which hydrodynamically penetrates the armor, killing occupants inside. The depth of the penetration, though proportional to the length of the jet and the square root of its density, is also dependent on the strength of the armor. With the development of this new ammunition, more advanced research into steel manufacturing began, and the development of spaced armor caused "jet waver" by detonating prematurely or at the wrong angle to the surface of the main armor.

The only significant attempt to experiment with the use of tanks in the late 1920s was the British Army's Experimental Mechanized Force, which influenced the future development of tanks, armored troops, and entire armies of both its future enemies and allies in the next war.

In Spain, the Nationalists' anti-tank defense was organized by Wehrmacht officers. The anti-tank guns were incorporated into a system of obstacles that were constructed with the intent to stop an attack by tanks by slowing it down, separating them from supporting infantry (advancing on foot) with machine-gun and mortar fire, and forcing tanks to conduct deliberate head-on assaults with engineer support, or seek a less-defended area to attack. Minefields laid with purpose-designed mines were used for the first time, destroying tank tracks, and forcing combat engineers to clear them on foot. Delay meant that Nationalist field artillery could engage the lightly armored Soviet tanks. This meant a change in Republican operational and eventually strategic planning, and a more protracted combat operations, with more casualties at a greater cost.

The only change to the German anti-tank tactics of the First World War was that now an effective anti-tank weapon was available to support the defending infantry. However, Soviet tanks armed with 45 mm guns easily destroyed German light tanks.

Ironically, from the early 1930s until the Spanish War, German officers conducted secret tests of a new way of employing tanks, infantry, and artillery offensively in the Soviet Union with the cooperation of the Red Army. In Germany, these developments culminated in tactics known as Blitzkrieg, while in the Soviet Union, they formed the core of the deep battle operational doctrine. The latter was successfully tested during the Battles of Khalkhin Gol. However, the Red Army foundered on the Mannerheim Line in 1940, largely due to the purge in the Officer Corps, claiming many of the senior proponents of the new doctrine. Anti-tank artillery would be included in mobile tank-led Wehrmacht and Red Army units due to the possibility of encountering enemy tanks in a meeting engagement.

The new doctrines of using the tank were divided into infantry and cavalry schools of thought. The former regarded the tank as a mobile artillery system for infantry support. This suggested that the infantry needed to be armed with integral anti-tank weapons. The latter advocated the use of tanks in the traditional cavalry way of high-tempo attacks intended to outflank the enemy infantry and sever its communication lines. This approach suggested that the tank was the best anti-tank system and that only a limited number of anti-tank troops were required to accompany it. For this reason, the late 30s tank configurations came in a great diversity, ranging from light tankettes and cavalry tanks to multi-turreted heavy tanks resembling bunkers, all of which had to be considered in training by the anti-tank artillery troops. The development of these doctrines was the most significant influence on the rapid development of anti-tank technology and tactics in the Second World War.

== Second World War ==
Two aspects of how the Second World War commenced helped to delay the development of anti-tank warfare: resignation and surprise. After Poland was attacked, its allies in the West were resigned to its defeat by a numerically superior Wehrmacht. The little information that was brought out about the conduct of combat during that campaign did nothing to convince either France, Britain, or the USSR of the need for improved anti-tank technology and tactics. The reliance on the Maginot Line and the subsequent surprise of the German offensive left no time to develop existing abilities and tactics in the West. The British were preparing the stop lines and the anti-tank islands to slow enemy progress and restrict the route of an attack. The Red Army, however, was fortunate in having several excellent designs for anti-tank warfare that were either in the final stages of development for production, or had been rejected earlier as unnecessary and could now be rushed into production. The relative ease with which the older models of the Red Army's tank fleet were destroyed by German anti-tank weapons, using tactics already seen in Spain, once and for all focused Stavka's attention on anti-tank warfare as panzer-led strategic pincer maneuvers repeatedly encircled Soviet armies. Of the major iconic Soviet weapons of the Second World War, two were made exclusively for anti-tank warfare, the T-34 and the Ilyushin Il-2 Shturmovik. The former was one of the most-produced tanks in history, and the latter, itself dubbed the 'flying tank', was one of the most-produced aircraft. The war also saw the creation and almost immediate abandonment of the self-propelled tank destroyer, which would be replaced post-war by the anti-tank guided missile.

"Fighting Men: Crack That Tank!" (1943) De-classified official U.S. Army anti-tank warfare training film reel.

"How To Destroy German Tanks" De-classified official U.S. Army anti-tank warfare training film reel.

=== Aircraft ===
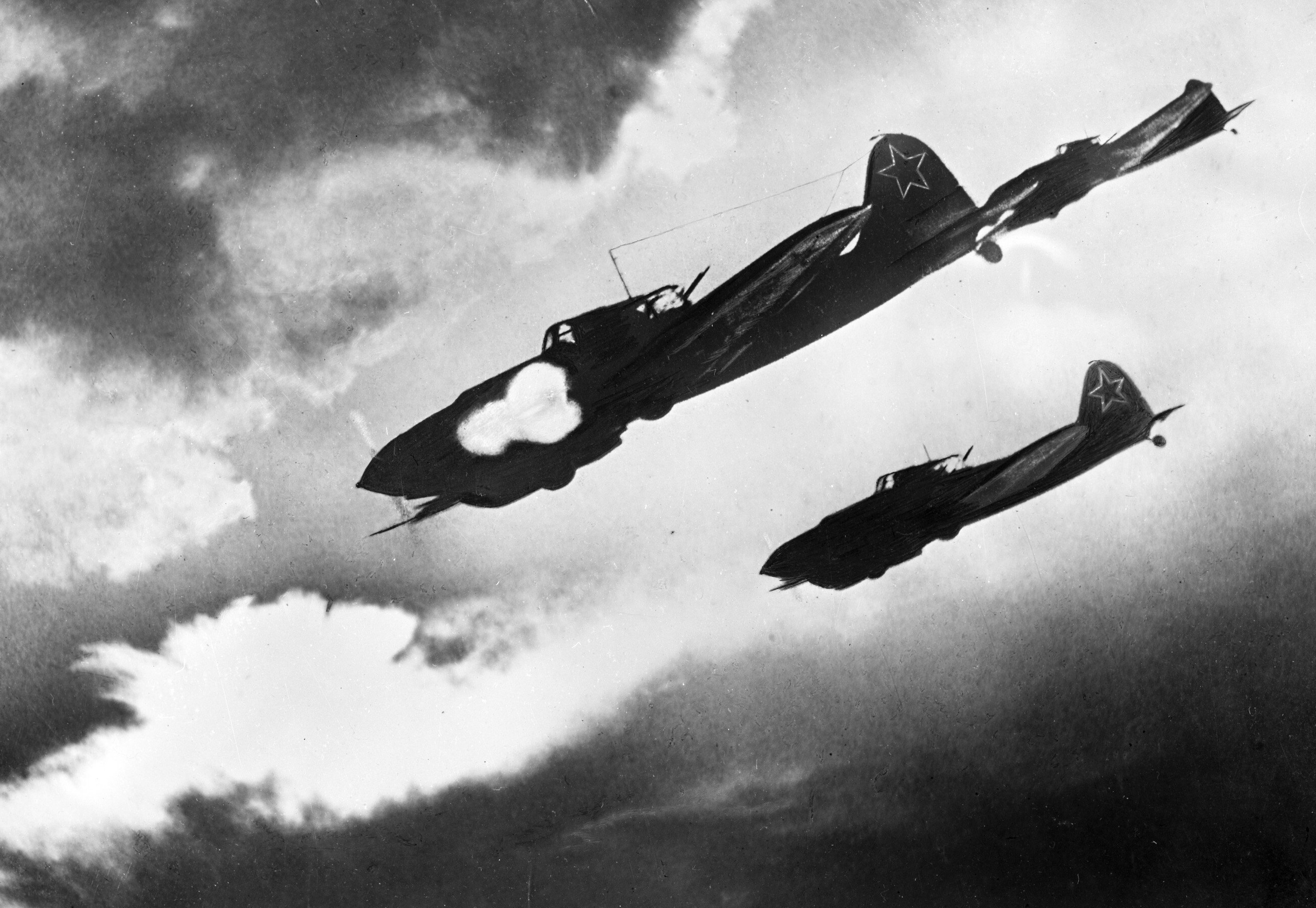
Soviet Ilyushin Il-2 planes with 23 mm cannons attacking a German tank column during the Battle of Kursk

As tanks were rarely used in conflicts between the two World Wars, no specific aircraft or tactics were developed to combat them from the air. One solution adopted by almost all European air forces was to use bomb loads for conventional bombers composed of small bombs, allowing a higher bomb density during bombing. This increased the likelihood of directly impacting the tank's thinner top armor while also damaging the track and wheels through proximity detonation.

The first aircraft capable of engaging tanks was the Junkers Ju 87 "Stuka," which used dive bombing to deliver the bomb close to the target. Some French and German fighters fitted with 20 mm cannons were also able to engage the tanks' thinner top armor early in the war. The Stuka was also equipped with cannons for an anti-armor role. However, it was obsolete by 1942, and was joined by the Henschel Hs 129 that mounted a podded 30 mm (1.2 in) MK 101 cannon beneath its fuselage, while the Red Army Air Force fielded the Soviet Ilyushin Il-2 armed with a pair of 23 mm cannons and unguided rockets, but armored to enable the pilots to approach German tanks at very low altitude, ignoring small arms, machine-gun and even small anti-aircraft cannon fire that usually provided tanks with protection against the bombers. Il-2s could also carry large numbers of 2.5 kg shaped-charge anti-tank PTAB bombs.

To give it more firepower against tanks, the RAF mounted two underwing pod-mounted 40 mm Vickers S cannon on the Hawker Hurricane (as the Mk. IID), which saw service in North Africa in 1942 and the Hawker Typhoon was given HE rockets. However, these were more effective against other ground vehicles. From March 1943 the Red Army Air Force produced the more agile Yakovlev Yak-9T (37 mm cannon) and K (45 mm cannon) bomber interceptor also used for ground attack, with one example of either gun in motornaya pushka mounts attached to the engine's gear reduction unit, that had either one of them firing through a hollow-center propeller shaft.

Following Operation Overlord in 1944, the military version of the slow-flying Piper J-3 Cub high-wing light civilian monoplane, the L-4 Grasshopper, usually used for liaison and artillery-spotting, began to be used in a light anti-armor role by a few U.S. Army artillery spotter units over France; these aircraft were field-outfitted with either two or four bazooka rocket launchers attached to the lift struts, against German armored fighting vehicles. During the summer of 1944, U.S. Army Major Charles Carpenter managed to successfully take on an anti-armor role with his rocket-armed Piper L-4. His L-4, named Rosie the Rocketeer, armed with six bazookas, had a notable anti-armor success during an engagement during the Battle of Arracourt on September 20, 1944, knocking out at least four German armored vehicles, as a pioneering example of taking on heavy enemy armor from a lightweight slow-flying aircraft.

=== Field artillery ===
Field artillery was often the first ground combat arm to engage a detected concentration of troops, including tanks, through artillery fire, airborne observers, either in assembly areas (for refueling and rearming), during approach marches to the combat zone, or as the tank unit was forming up for the attack. Conventional artillery shells were very effective against the tank's thinner top armor when fired at appropriate density while the tanks were concentrated, enabling direct hits from sufficiently powerful shells. Even a non-penetrating shell could still disable a tank through dynamic shock, internal armor shattering, or simply by overturning it. More importantly, the tanks could be disabled by damage to tracks and wheels, and their supporting vehicles and personnel could be damaged or killed, reducing the unit's ability to fight in the longer term. Because tanks were usually accompanied by infantry mounted on trucks or half-tracked vehicles that lacked overhead armor, field artillery firing a mix of ground- and air-burst ammunition was likely to inflict heavy casualties on the infantry as well. Field guns, such as the Ordnance QF 25 pounder, were provided with armor-piercing shot for direct engagement of enemy tanks.

=== Anti-tank guns ===
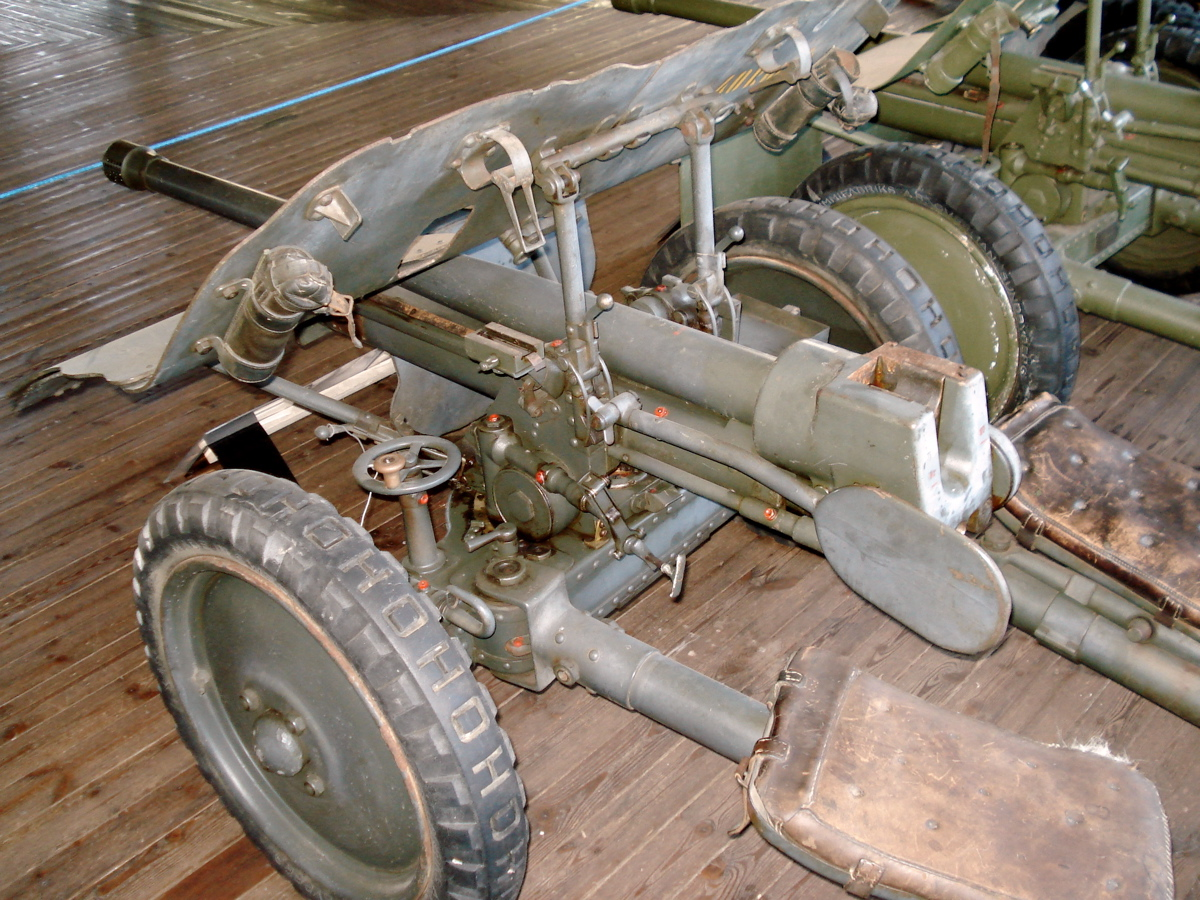
Bofors 37 mm anti-tank gun as used by several nations

Anti-tank guns are guns designed to destroy armored vehicles from defensive positions. To penetrate vehicle armor, they fire smaller caliber shells from longer-barreled guns to achieve higher muzzle velocity than field artillery weapons, many of which are howitzers. The higher velocity, flatter trajectory ballistics provides terminal kinetic energy to penetrate the moving/static target's armor at a given range and contact angle. Any field artillery cannon with a barrel length 15 to 25 times longer than its caliber was able to fire anti-tank ammunition, such as the Soviet A-19.

Before World War II, few anti-tank guns had (or needed) calibers larger than 50 mm. Examples of guns in this class include the German 37 mm, US 37 mm (the largest gun able to be towed by the 1/4-ton, 4×4 'jeep'), French 25 mm and 47 mm guns, British QF 2-pounder (40 mm), Italian 47 mm and Soviet 45 mm. All of these light weapons could penetrate the thin armor found on most pre-war and early-war tanks.

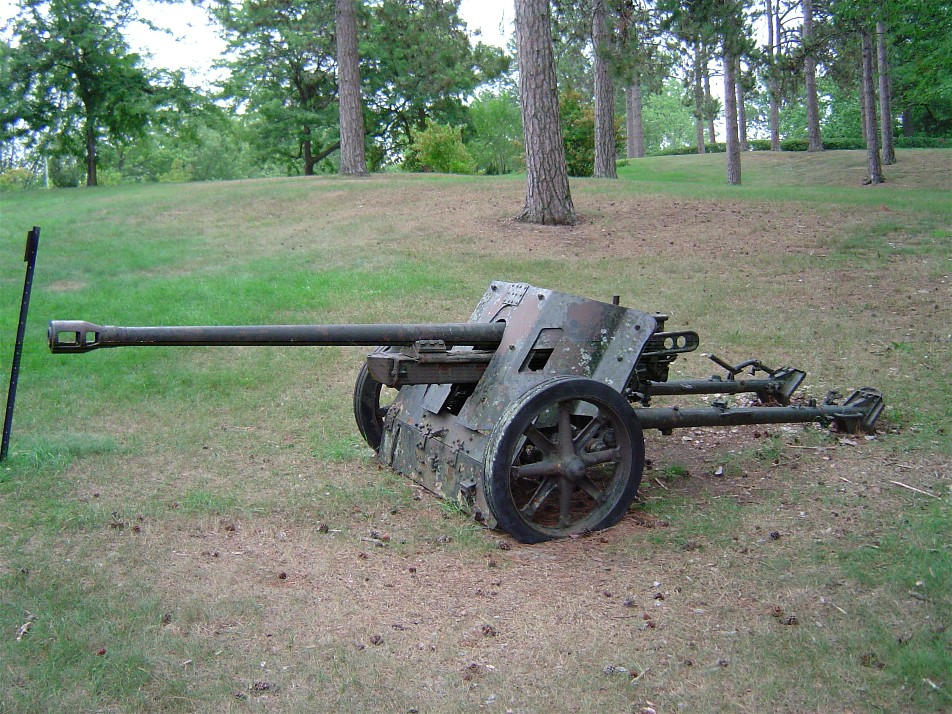
German PaK 38 50-mm anti-tank gun

At the start of World War II, many of these weapons were still in operational use, along with a newer generation of light guns that closely resembled their WWI counterparts. After the well-armoured Soviet T-34 medium and KV heavy tanks were encountered, these guns were recognized as ineffective against sloped armor, with the German lightweight 37 mm gun quickly nicknamed the "tank door knocker" (German: Panzeranklopfgerät), for revealing its presence without penetrating the armor.

Germany introduced more powerful anti-tank guns, some of which had been in the early stages of development before the war. By late 1942, the Germans had an excellent 50-mm high-velocity design, while they faced the QF 6-pounder introduced in the North African Campaign by the British Army, and later adopted by the US Army. By 1943, the Wehrmacht was forced to adopt still larger calibers on the Eastern Front, the 75 mm and the famous 88 mm guns. The Red Army used a variety of 45 mm, 57 mm, and 100 mm guns, and deployed general-purpose 76.2 mm and 122-mm guns in the anti-tank role. By the time of the Invasion of Normandy, the British had the 3 in (76 mm) calibre QF 17 pounder, which design had begun before the 6 pounder entered service, in general use which proved to be a highly effective anti-tank gun and was also used on the Sherman Firefly tank, the Archer self-propelled gun, and on the 17-pdr SP Achilles

==== Tank destroyers ====
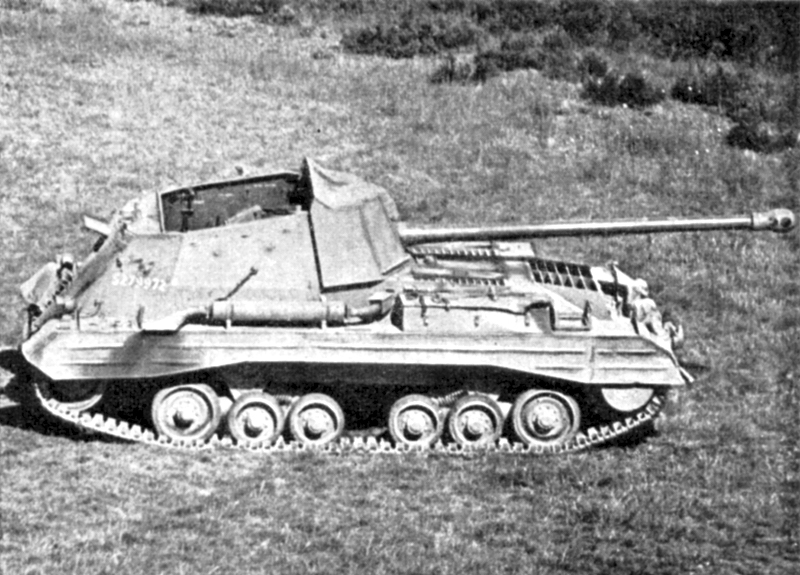
The British Archer self-propelled anti-tank gun put the 17-pdr gun on the hull of a Valentine tank

As towed anti-tank cannon guns grew in size and weight, they became less mobile and more cumbersome to maneuver, and required ever larger gun crews, who often had to wrestle the gun into position while under heavy artillery and/or tank fire. As the war progressed, this disadvantage often resulted in the loss or destruction of both the anti-tank gun and its trained crew. This spurred the development of the self-propelled, lightly armored "tank destroyer" (TD). The tank destroyer was usually based on the hull of an existing tank design, using either an integrated gun or a fully rotating turret, much like a conventional tank. These self-propelled (SP) AT guns were first employed as infantry support weapons in place of towed anti-tank guns. Later, due to a shortage of tanks, TDs sometimes replaced the former in offensive armored operations.

Early German-designed tank destroyers, such as the Marder I, employed existing light French or Czech tank chassis and mounted an AT gun within an armored, turretless superstructure. This method reduced both weight and conversion costs. The Soviet Union later adopted this style of self-propelled anti-tank gun or tank destroyer. This type of tank destroyer had the advantage of a reduced silhouette, allowing the crew to more frequently fire from defilade ambush positions. Such designs were easier and faster to manufacture and offered good crew protection, though the lack of a turret limited the gun's traverse to a few degrees. This meant that, if the TD became immobilized due to engine failure or track damage, it could not rotate its gun to counter opposing tanks, making it an easy target. This vulnerability was later exploited by opposing tank forces. Late in the war, it was not unusual to find even the largest and most powerful tank destroyer abandoned on the field after a battle, having been immobilized by one high-explosive shell to the track or front drive sprocket.

US Army pre-war infantry support doctrines emphasized the use of tank destroyers with open-top, fully rotating turrets, featuring less armor than the standard M4 Sherman tanks but with more powerful cannons. A 76 mm long-barrel tank cannon was fitted to the Sherman-based M10 GMC and all-new design M18 designs, with the M18 being the fastest-moving American AFV of any type in World War II. Late in 1944, the Sherman-origin M36 appeared, equipped with a 90 mm cannon. With rotating turrets and good combat maneuverability, American TD designs generally worked well, although their light armor was no match for enemy tank cannon fire during one-on-one confrontations. Another disadvantage proved to be the open, unprotected turret, and casualties from artillery fire soon led to the introduction of folding armor turret covers. Near the war's end, a change in official doctrine caused both the self-propelled tank destroyer and the towed anti-tank gun to fall out of favor in U.S. service, increasingly being replaced by conventional tanks or infantry-level anti-tank weapons. Despite this change, the M36 tank destroyer continued in service, and was used in combat as late as the Korean War.

The third, and likely most effective kind of tank destroyer was the unturreted, casemate-style tank destroyer, known by the Jagdpanzer term in German service, or Samokhodnaya Ustanovka in Soviet service for their own designs. These generally featured a heavy gun mounted on an older or then-current tank chassis, with the gun pointing forward and limited traverse. Casemate tank destroyers often had the same amount of armor as the tanks they were based on. The removal of the turret allowed for more space to mount a larger gun with a larger breech and left room for the crew. Many casemate tank destroyers either originated as or were dual-purpose vehicles with the duties of a self-propelled gun, and share many (but usually not all) of the same features and layout. Some examples are the German Sturmgeschütz III – the most-produced German armored fighting vehicle of WW II — and the Soviets' SU-100, itself based on the T-34 tank's hull and drivetrain.

=== Infantry ===
==== Rifles ====
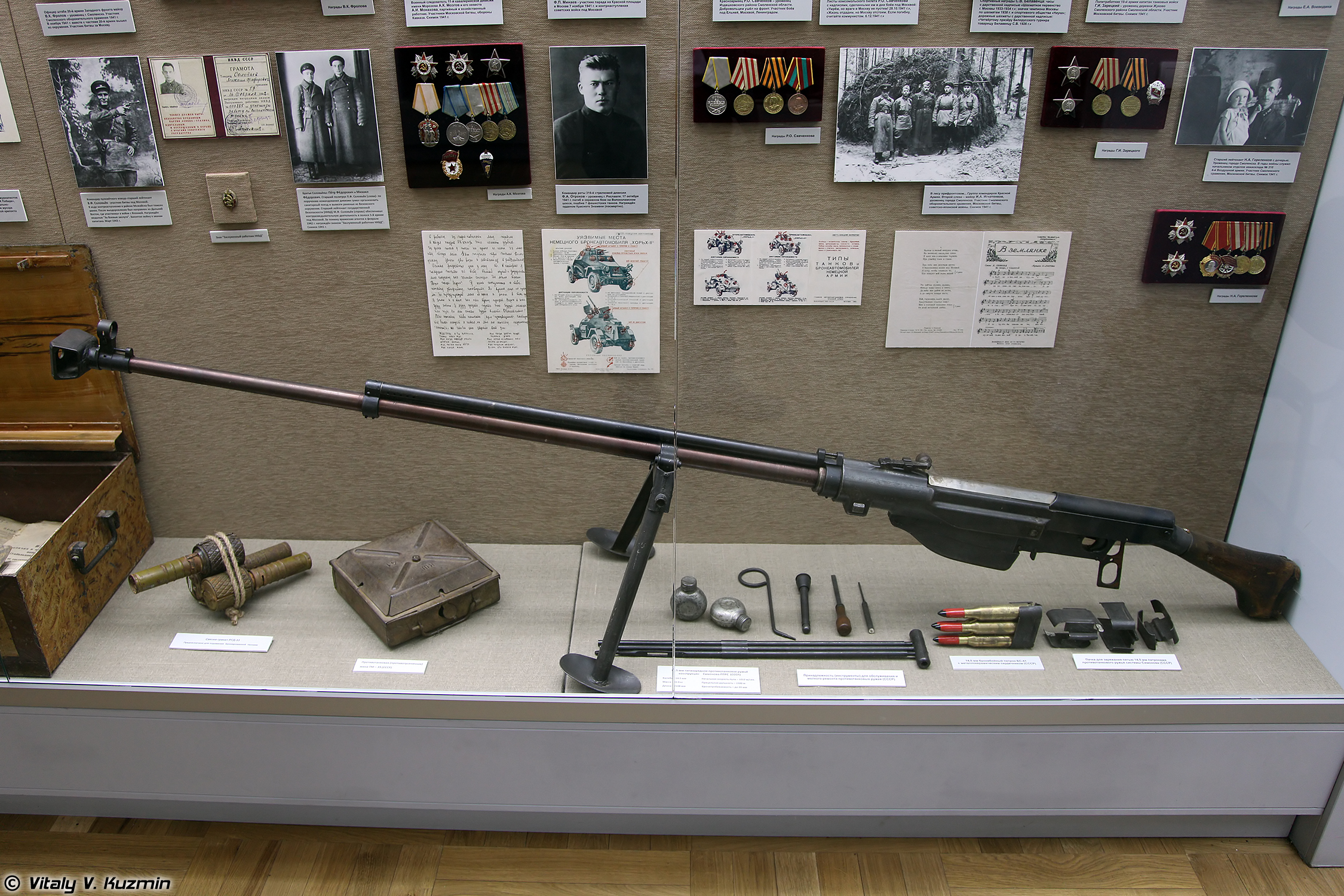
PTRS-41 anti-tank rifle at the Museum of the Great Patriotic War, Moscow

Anti-tank rifles were introduced in some armies before the Second World War to provide infantry with a stand-off weapon against a tank assault. The intention was to preserve the morale of the infantry by providing a weapon capable of actually defeating a tank. Anti-tank rifles were developed in several countries during the 1930s. By the beginning of WW2, anti-tank rifle teams could knock out most tanks from a distance of about 500 m, using a weapon that was man-portable and easily concealed. Although the AT rifle's effectiveness was negated by the increased armor of medium and heavy tanks by 1942, it remained viable against lighter- and unarmored vehicles and against field fortification embrasures.

Notable examples include the Finnish Lahti L-39 (which was also used as a sniper rifle during the Continuation War), the automatic Japanese Type 97 20 mm anti-tank rifle, the German Panzerbüchse 38, Panzerbüchse 39, the Polish wz.35 and the Soviet 14.5 mm PTRD and PTRS-41.

By 1943, most armies judged anti-tank rifles to be ineffective in combat due to their diminished ability to penetrate the thicker armor of new tanks – the British Army had abandoned them by 1942 and the Wehrmacht by 1943, while the US Army never adopted the weapon. However, the USMC used Boys anti-tank rifles in the Pacific Theater. However, the anti-tank rifle remained in Soviet use during the conflict due to its importance in its doctrine of anti-tank in-depth defense, first demonstrated during the defense of Moscow and again during the Kursk battles. This became particularly true later in the war, when the Red Army launched an almost constant offensive, and anti-tank, in-depth defensive deployments were used to protect the flanks of operational breakthroughs against German tactical counterattacks. By firing on the lighter armored infantry and support vehicles (e.g., artillery tractors) the anti-tank rifle units helped to separate the supporting infantry (panzergrenadiers) and artillery of the German tanks and so forced the tanks to halt at short distances from the concealed anti-tank guns leaving them exposed to fire from larger, longer ranged anti-tank guns. PTRS-41 semi-automatic anti-tank rifles were also used for sniping since an additional tracer round enabled rapid fire adjustment by the gunner. Although optical sniper scopes were tried on the PTRS-41, the weapons proved too inaccurate at sniping distances (800 m or more) and had too much recoil for effective use of the scopes.

==== Rockets and shaped charges ====
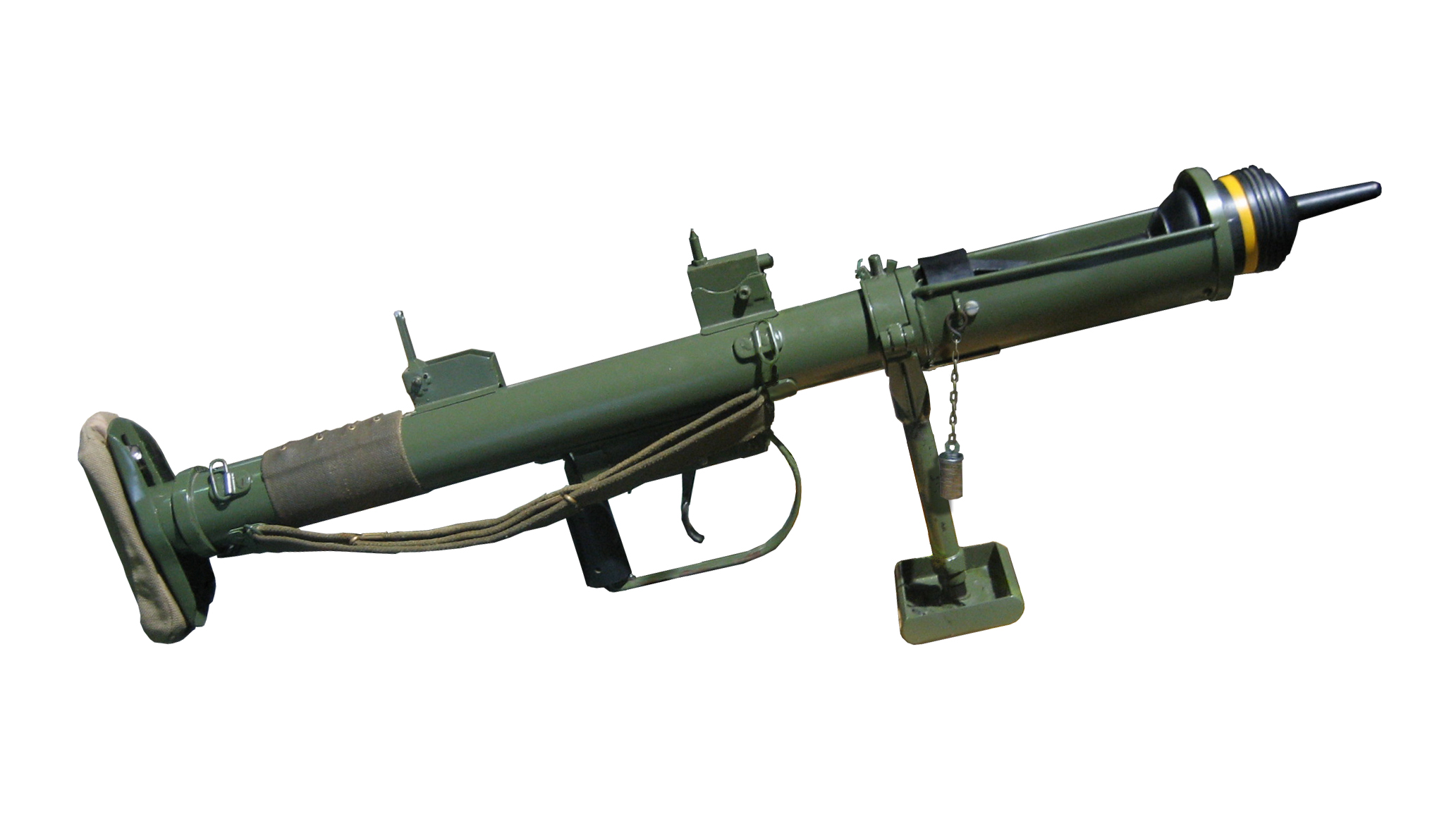
British PIAT

The development of light, man-portable, anti-tank weapons increased during the Second World War. Most were based on the Munroe effect, which led to the development of the high-explosive shaped charge. These weapons were called high-explosive anti-tank (HEAT). The destructive effect relies entirely on the kinetic energy of the explosion rather than on the round's ballistic speed in inflicting damage to the armor. The effect was also concentrated and could penetrate more armor for a given amount of explosives. The first HEAT rounds were rifle grenades, but better delivery systems were soon introduced: the British PIAT was propelled like the spigot mortar with a blackpowder charge contained in the tailfin assembly, the US bazooka and the German Panzerschreck used rockets; the German Panzerfaust was a small recoilless gun. The HEAT warhead was retroactively used to give more power to smaller caliber weapons, such as in the conversion of the otherwise limited German 37 mm PaK guns to fire a large shell, called Stielgranate 41, that fitted over the barrel rather than down in it, to a greater range than the Panzerschreck could manage.

The Hungarian 44M "Buzogányvető" was a successful unguided rocket used extensively in the Siege of Budapest.

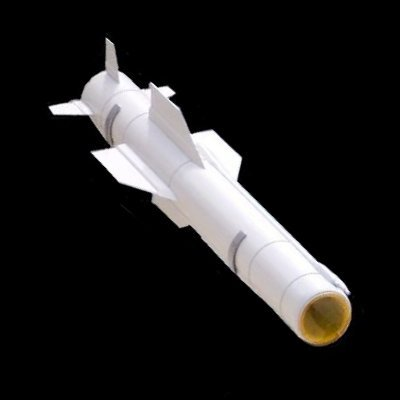
PARS 3 LR with HEAT warhead of the German Army.

After the war, research on infantry anti-tank weapons continued, with most designers focused on two primary goals: first, an anti-tank weapon capable of defeating more heavily armored postwar tanks and fighting vehicles; and second, a weapon lightweight and portable enough for infantry use.

==== Mines and other explosives ====
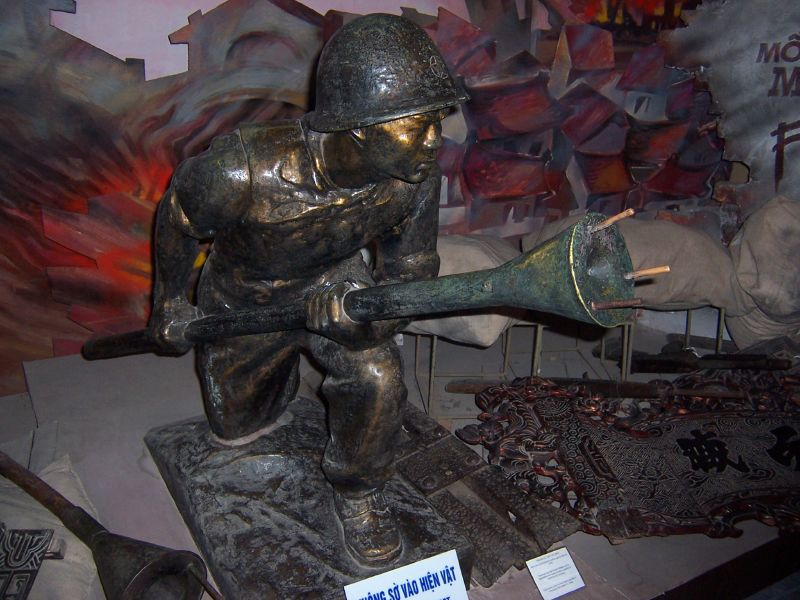
A statue of a Vietminh soldier holding a Lunge AT Mine. In Vietnamese, the mine is called bom ba càng, which literally means "three-clawed bomb".

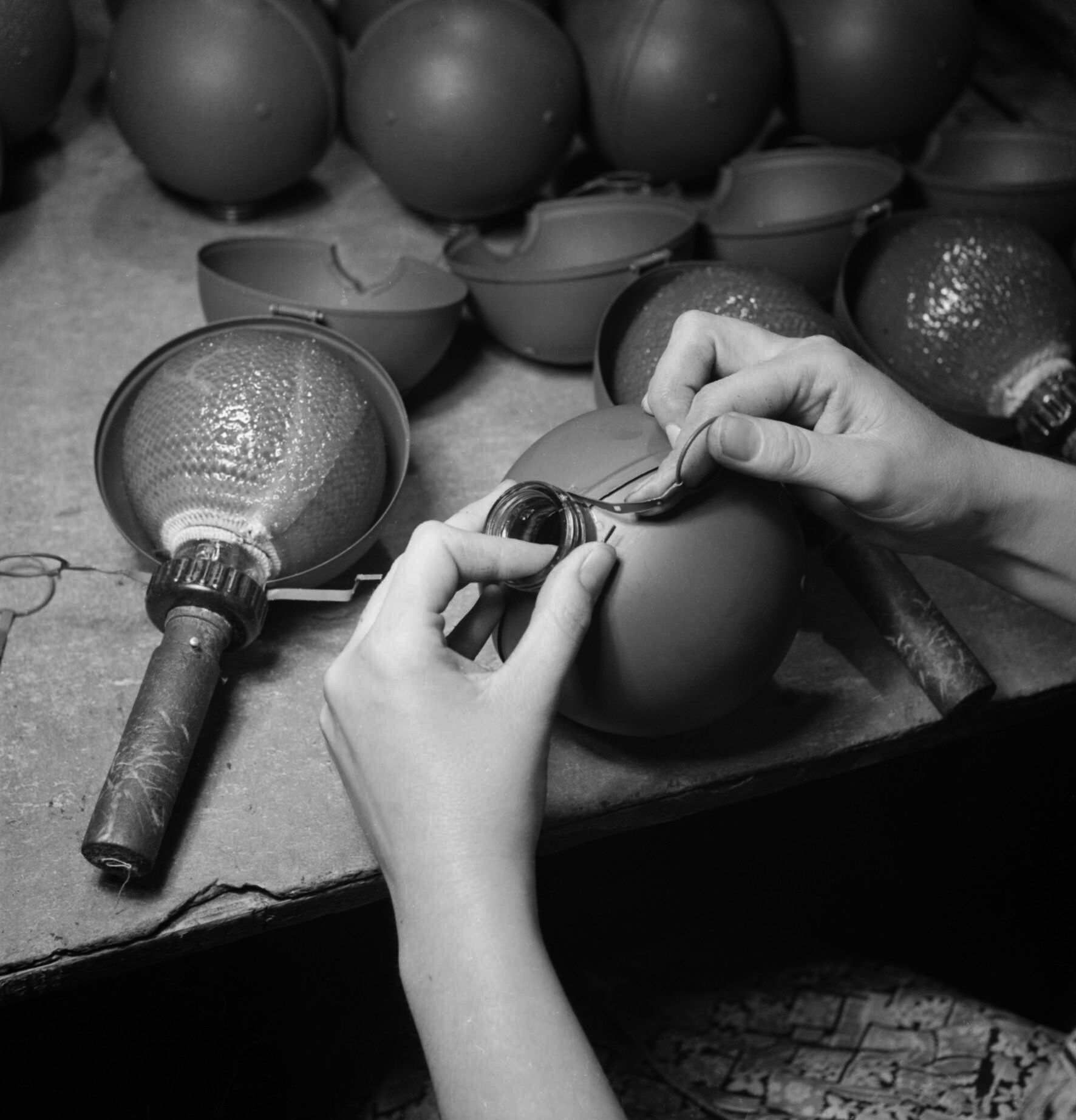
Sticky bomb in production

- Though unsophisticated, the satchel charge was an effective anti-tank weapon during World War II; the blast could sever the tracks of a tank, damage internal components, or injure the crew.
- Hawkins mine
- The Wehrmacht employed the Goliath tracked mine, an unmanned demolition vehicle.
- The Soviet Union employed anti-tank dogs during World War II, with very limited success; as a counterpart to the German Goliath, the Teletank was used as a remote-controlled unmanned tank.
- The Japanese forces employed suicide attacks with pole-mounted anti-tank mines dubbed lunge mines during late World War II. In Vietnam, similar mines were called bom ba càng due to the three contact points at the head of each mine.

==== Grenades ====
Regular fragmentation grenades were ineffective against tanks, so many types of anti-tank grenades were developed. These ranged from hollow charge designs (e.g., the British No. 68 AT Grenade) to those containing a large amount of explosive (the British No. 73 Grenade). To increase their effectiveness, some grenades were designed to adhere to the tank either with an adhesive (sticky bomb) or with a magnet. The Germans used a magnetic grenade, the Hafthohlladung, to ensure that the shaped charge would fire at the optimal 90° angle to the armor.

There was also a special type of grenade called the Nebelhandgranaten or Blendkörper ("smoke hand grenades"), which was supposed to be smashed over an air vent to fill the tank with smoke and was widely used by both sides in World War II. Molotov cocktails also saw widespread use, especially in the Winter War, with early tanks (such as the T-26) being very vulnerable to them; later tanks required a well-thrown bottle directly over the engine compartment to have any effect at all.

On the whole, thrown anti-tank weapons suffered from a variety of drawbacks. In addition to the inherently short range, they required careful aim to be effective, and those that relied on explosive force were often so powerful that the user had to take cover immediately.

Additionally, with hand-thrown grenades, the requirement for the attacker to get close to the tank made the attacker exceptionally vulnerable to counterattack from the tank (typically by machine gun), or from infantry – mounted or dismounted troops – accompanying the tank. However, if the attacker were very low to the ground, and in very close proximity to the tank – for instance, 30 feet (9.1 meters) or less – it might be impossible for the tank crew to see the attacker.

=== Tactics ===
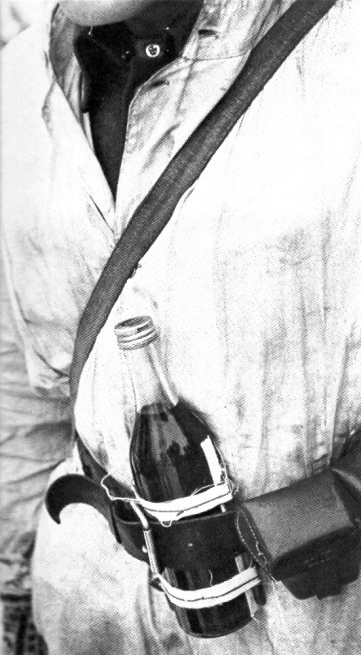
A Finnish soldier with a Molotov cocktail in the 1939–40 Winter War.

Anti-tank tactics developed rapidly during the war, but along different paths across armies, depending on the threats they faced and the technologies they could produce. Very little development took place in the UK because weapons available in 1940 were judged adequate for engaging Italian and German tanks during most of the North African Campaign. Its experience, therefore, failed to influence the US Army's anti-tank doctrine before 1944. From 1941, German anti-tank tactics developed rapidly after being surprised by previously unknown Soviet tank designs, prompting the introduction of new technologies and tactics. The Red Army also faced a new challenge in anti-tank warfare after losing most of its tank fleet and a considerable portion of its anti-tank-capable cannons.

Anti-tank tactics during the war were largely integrated with the offensive or defensive posture of the troops being supported, usually infantry. Most anti-tank tactics depend on the effective ranges of the available weapons and weapon systems. These are divided as follows:

- Operational range over the horizon (20–40 km range)
  Bomber aircraft and long-range artillery
- Tactical staging areas (7–20 km range)
  Ground attack aircraft and field artillery including MRLs
- Tactical zone forming-up area and rear combat zone (2–7 km range)
  Heavy anti-tank guns and mortars
- Tactical forward combat zone (1–2 km range)
  Anti-tank guns and tanks deployed in defense
- Engagement distance (200–1000 m range)
  Mines and anti-tank rifles
- Close combat distance (25–200 m range)
  Infantry anti-tank weapons

Ground-to-air cooperation was not yet systematic in any army of the period, but, given sufficient warning, ground attack aircraft could support ground troops, even during an enemy attack, in an attempt to interdict enemy units before they entered the tactical combat zone. Various bomb loads can be used depending on the type of tank unit engaged at the time or who its accompanying troops are. This is an indirect form of anti-tank warfare in which tanks are denied the opportunity even to reach combat.

Field artillery was particularly effective in firing against tank formations because, although they were rarely able to destroy a tank by direct penetration, they would severely crater the area, preventing the tanks from moving, therefore causing them to become nearly stationary targets for the ground attack aircraft, or disrupting the enemy schedule and allowing their own troops more time to prepare their defense.

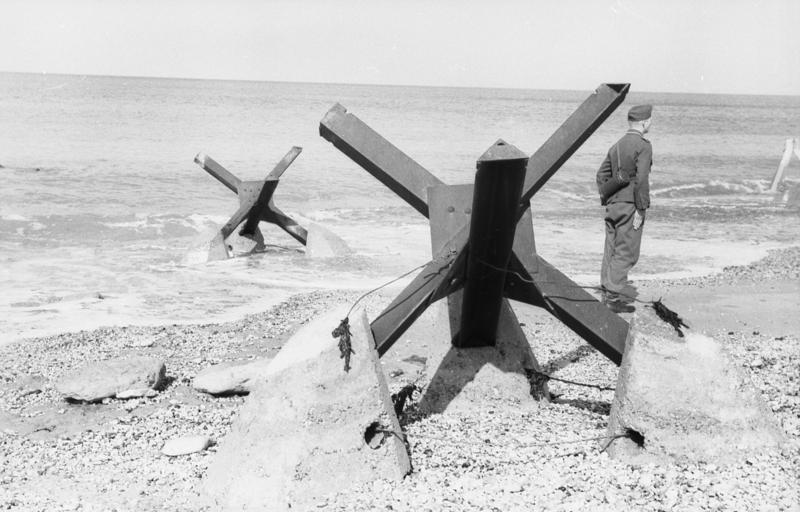
Examples of Czech hedgehogs deployed on the Atlantic Wall in the vicinity of Calais.

Anti-tank defense proper was, by 1942, designed in First World War fashion, with several prepared trench lines incorporating anti-tank weapons of varying capabilities. Depending on terrain and the available line-of-sight, the longer-ranged guns could begin to fire on approaching tanks from as far as 2 kilometers, which was also the range at which German Panther and Tiger tank gunners were trained to fire. Anti-tank guns were usually deployed to cover terrain more suitable for tanks and were protected by minefields laid by combat engineers at about 500 meters to 1 kilometer from their positions. In the Red Army, anti-tank rifle units would be positioned throughout the forward trench line and would engage lighter tanks and other vehicles, such as infantry half-tracks, to separate them from the tanks. The anti-tank guns deployed further back would often hold their fire until enemy tanks were within the most effective range for their ammunition. Where there were insufficient anti-tank weapons, engineers would construct anti-tank obstacles such as dragon's teeth or Czech hedgehog.

Towed anti-tank guns were considered the primary means of defeating tanks. At the battle of Kursk, for example, the Red Army deployed more artillery regiments than infantry regiments, and towed gun densities reached over 20 guns per kilometer of defended tactical zone. A towed gun was much cheaper than a tank and could be concealed in a shallow position. When time allowed, dugouts with strong overhead cover could be constructed. Guns deployed on reverse slopes and in flanking positions could take a toll on attacking tanks. However, gun crews were vulnerable to artillery, mortar HE fire, and enemy infantry. Their positions had to be carefully selected, and once engaged, they generally could not redeploy. Experience strongly suggested that towed AT guns were less effective than self-propelled AT weapons and took heavier casualties.

The tactic of ambushing enemy armor at grazing shot distances was perfected during World War 2. Some combatants, such as the Soviet Red Army, doctrinally applied it to engage heavy German armor at optimal ranges and angles.

Self-propelled anti-tank guns were rare at the beginning of WW2, although the Belgian Army deployed a few T.15 tank destroyers and the French Army was developing several wheeled and tracked designs. The advantages of mobility and even thin armor protection were so compelling that most armies were using self-propelled AT guns by mid-war. Examples of these weapons included the US M10 GMC, German Jagdpanzer IV, and Soviet SU-85.

==== Infantry close assault ====
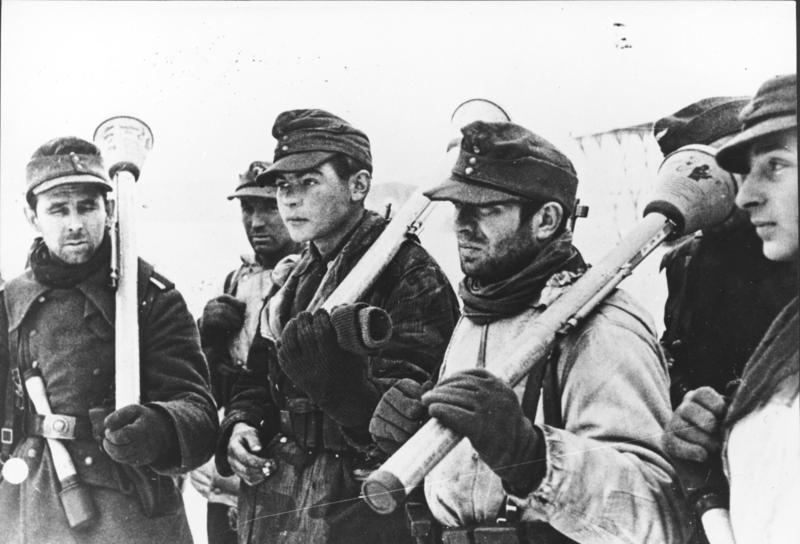
Panzerfaust armed German soldiers on the Eastern Front, 1945.

The tank is still vulnerable to infantry, especially in close country or built-up areas. Rough terrain may expose the floor armor, and high ground, such as multi-story buildings, may expose the top armor. Their large size and loud noise can allow enemy infantry to spot, track, and evade tanks until an opportunity presents itself for counterattack.

Because tank crews have limited visibility from inside the tank, infantry can get close to a tank, given enough concealment and closed hatches. If tank crew members unbutton for better visibility, they become vulnerable to small arms fire, grenades, and Molotov cocktails. A foot soldier cannot be targeted by a tank's main gun when close, as it cannot depress sufficiently. Close-defense weapons such as pistol ports, hull-mounted, coaxial, and pintle-mounted machine guns, however, gave them some protection.

Whilst many handheld infantry anti-tank weapons will not penetrate the front armor of a tank, they may penetrate the less heavily armored top, rear, and sides. Anti-tank weapons can damage the tracks or running gear to inflict a mobility kill. Early WWII tanks had open vision slits that could be fired through to harm the crew. Later tanks' slits had thick glass, sights, and periscopes that could still be damaged by powerful small arms such as anti-tank rifles and heavy machine guns, hampering the crew. If all else fails, the hatch could be forced open and grenades thrown inside, although later tank designs often have hatches that are difficult to open from the outside.

Tanks were also vulnerable to hand-placed anti-tank mines. Infantry have even immobilized tanks using a set of plates covered with leaves and dirt as dummy mines – the ruse being augmented by the crew's obscured vision – infantry can then attack the stopped tank. This tactic was taught to the British Home Guard during World War II, as they were rarely provided with long-range anti-tank weapons.

In the Japanese Army, the use of satchel charges and pole charges was widespread. Although the charges could knock out any allied tank, the tactic was extremely close-range, and the sappers were vulnerable to allied weapons.

==== Suicide bombing ====
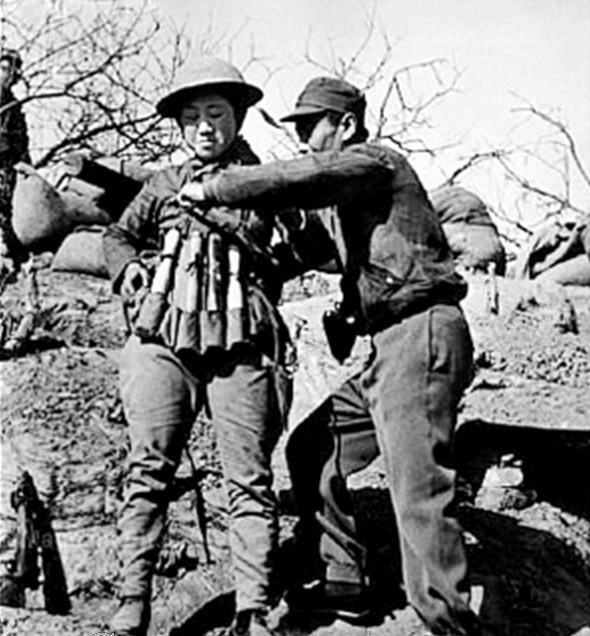
Chinese suicide bomber putting on an explosive vest made out of Model 24 hand grenades to use in an attack on Japanese tanks at the Battle of Taierzhuang.

Chinese troops in the Second Sino-Japanese War used suicide bombing against Japanese tanks. Chinese troops strapped explosives like grenade packs or dynamite to their bodies and threw themselves under Japanese tanks to blow them up. This tactic was used during the Battle of Shanghai, where a Chinese suicide bomber stopped a Japanese tank column by exploding himself beneath the lead tank, and at the Battle of Taierzhuang where dynamite and grenades were strapped on by Chinese troops who rushed at Japanese tanks and blew themselves up. During one incident at Taierzhuang, Chinese suicide bombers obliterated four Japanese tanks with grenade bundles.

South Koreans attacked North Korean tanks with suicide tactics during the North Korean invasion of the South.

North Korean suicide squads attacked American tanks at Seoul, who used satchel charges. A North Korean soldier who exploded an American tank with a suicide bomb named Li Su-Bok is hailed as a hero in North Korean propaganda.

During the Iran–Iraq War, the Iranian Mohammad Hossein Fahmideh blew himself up under an Iraqi tank with a grenade.

According to the Sudanese writer Mansour Al-Hadj, Sudanese jihadists were trained to attack enemy tanks by suicide bombing them.

== Korean War ==
The initial assault by North Korean KPA forces during the Korean War was aided by the use of Soviet T-34-85 tanks. A North Korean tank corps equipped with about 120 T-34s spearheaded the invasion. These drove against a ROK Army with few anti-tank weapons adequate to deal with the Soviet T-34s. The North Korean tanks had a good deal of early successes against South Korean infantry, elements of the 24th Infantry Division, and the United States built M24 Chaffee light tanks that they encountered. For the UN forces, aerial interdiction by ground attack aircraft was the only means of slowing the advancing North Korean armor. The tide turned in favour of the United Nations forces in August 1950 when the North Koreans suffered major tank losses during a series of battles in which the UN forces brought heavier equipment to develop an anti-tank role, including U.S. M4A3 Sherman medium tanks backed by M26 Pershing and M46 Patton heavy tanks, along with British Centurion, Churchill, and Cromwell tanks.

In the U.S., the 2.36 in (60 mm) M9A1 bazooka rocket launcher evolved into the more powerful 3.5 in (89 mm) M20 "Super Bazooka", which was used to good effect against North Korean armored spearheads during the Korean War. However, the M20 proved difficult and cumbersome to portage over long distances on foot. The Anti-Tank Aircraft Rocket, developed by the navy, also proved effective against North Korean tanks.

== Cold War ==
"How to Fight the Soviet Tank-Mechanized Infantry Team" (1976) - De-classified US Army training information reel.

In the Cold War era, HEAT became an almost universal choice outside of artillery and tank units. The British had developed the High-explosive squash head (HESH) warhead as a weapon for attacking fortifications during the war, and found it surprisingly effective against tanks. Although these systems allowed infantry to engage even the largest tanks and, like HEAT, were effective regardless of range, they typically operated at short range. A major influence in anti-tank warfare came with the development and evolution of anti-tank guided missiles (ATGM) that could be fired by infantry operators, from ground vehicles, and by aircraft. Increasing use of combined arms tactics allowed the attacking infantry to effectively suppress the anti-tank crews, meaning they could typically get off only one or two shots before being countered or forced to move.

=== Aircraft ===
==== Fixed-Wing ====
Cold War-era aircraft, such as the A-10 Thunderbolt II and SU-25 Frogfoot, were specifically designed for close air support, including tank destruction. They can use a variety of weaponry, including large-caliber anti-tank autocannons or rotary autocannons, air-to-surface missiles (e.g. AGM-65 Maverick), volleys of unguided rockets, and various bombs (unguided or laser-guided and with or without submunitions such as HEAT bomblets, an example of which would be the CBU-100 Cluster Bomb).

==== Helicopter ====
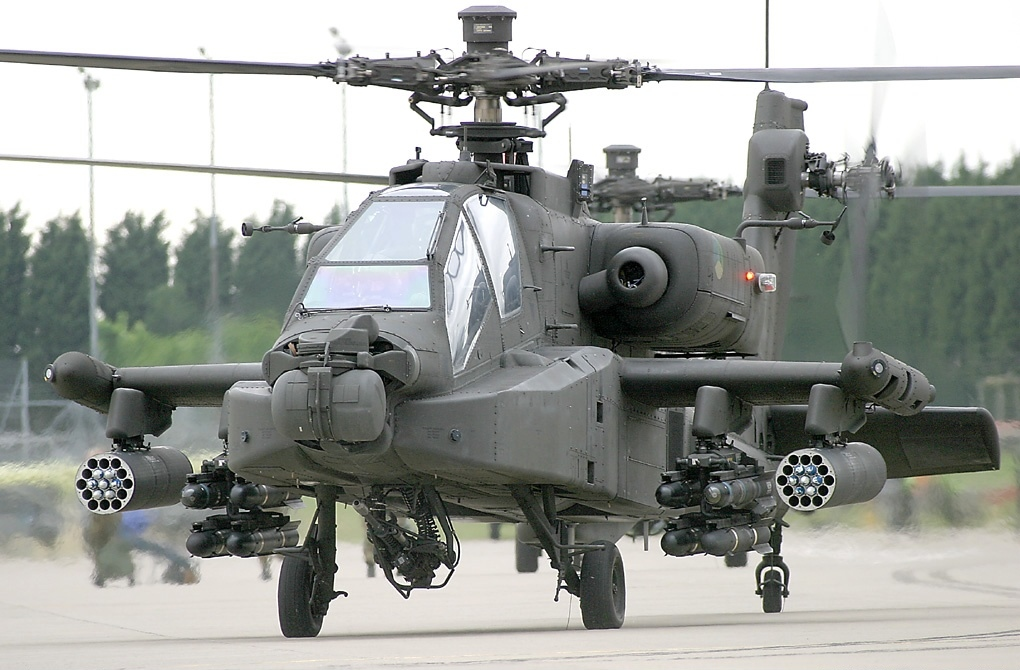
AH-64 Apache, an anti-tank helicopter with eight AGM-114 Hellfire missiles

Guided anti-tank missiles were first used in a helicopter-borne role by the French in the late 1950s, when they mounted SS.11 wire-guided missiles on Alouette II helicopters. Initially, there were many teething problems; however, the possibilities, such as providing the ability to attack the more lightly armored top of the tank, were clear.

Although mounting weapons on helicopters (probably) dates back to 1955 with the Bell 47, the first specific attack helicopter to enter mass production was the Bell AH-1 Cobra in 1966. The AH-1 was equipped with TOW missiles in 1973 to enhance its anti-tank capability.

The anti-tank helicopter armed with ATGWs (Anti-Tank Guided Weapons) or anti-tank cannons is one of the biggest threats to a modern tank. The helicopter can position itself where it is not easily seen from a tank and then attack from any quarter, exposing the weaker parts of the tank's armor. The limited visibility from a closed-down tank also makes it harder to sight a helicopter.

Most helicopter-launched ATGWs have sufficient range that they can, under the right conditions, be fired at a range too long for the tank to retaliate with its own weapons. This may change with the Israelis fielding the 105 mm and 120 mm LAHAT missiles that can be fired from the main gun of the Merkava MBT. With both anti-tank and anti-helicopter roles, it does level the playing field somewhat. The Indian Arjun tank has also been modified to fire this missile. The People's Republic of China has developed 100 mm gun-launched missiles based on Russian designs, such as the GP2 (based on the Russian Bastion). It has been reported to have successfully engaged aerial targets and is an anti-tank missile. Similar missiles are available for Chinese tanks equipped with the 105 mm gun. The Russians have also displayed a similar, if more advanced, system in the Reflex. The system involves an automatic targeting of an aerial/land target instigated by a laser warning system.

=== Artillery ===
In the last thirty years, however, a variety of artillery projectiles have been developed specifically to attack tanks. These include laser-guided projectiles, such as the US's Copperhead Cannon Launched Guided Projectile (CLGP), which increases the chances of a direct hit. Some of these CLGPs (including the Copperhead) have HEAT warheads instead of common HE.

Guided and unguided scatter munitions and submunitions have also been developed: one artillery shell containing several smaller munitions designed to attack a tank. A six-gun battery might be able to fire several hundred submunitions in a minute or two.

In one form, a shell bursts in the air above one or more tanks and several shaped charge (HEAT) or high-explosive dual-purpose (HEDP) bomblets or grenades rain down. Any that hit a tank have a good chance of causing damage, since they strike thin top armor.

Another form scatters many small anti-tank mines in a tank's path, which probably will not penetrate the armor but can damage a track, leaving the tank immobile and vulnerable.

More sophisticated are submunitions with a homing ability. Once again, the shell explodes above the tank position and dispenses several submunitions. The munitions contain some circuitry to identify tanks, such as IR or millimeter radar. When a tank is identified, a rocket-propellant charge is fired to launch the projectile at the tank. These munitions will often descend by parachute, to allow time for target acquisition and attack.

All of the above, but the CLGP can be fired from medium (105 mm, 120 mm, and 125 mm) tank guns and medium (122 mm, 130 mm, 152 mm, and 155 mm) tube artillery. There has also been development of medium and large (81 mm, 82 mm, and 120 mm) guided mortar munitions with both internal (e.g., IR or radar) or external (i.e., laser designator) guidance.

=== Missiles ===
The development of the wire-guided missile, or Anti-Tank Guided Weapon (ATGW) systems, came into use in the late 1950s and 1960s and could defeat any known tank at ranges beyond those of the accompanying infantry's guns. The United Kingdom, France, and other NATO countries were among the first to develop such weapons (e.g., the Malkara missile by the United Kingdom and Australia in 1958). The Soviet Union, and now Russia, invested heavily in these weapons; the first man-portable model to enter service was the AT-3 in 1961. The United States was one of the last to develop the BGM-71 TOW in 1970.

For a time, it appeared that the tank was a dead end. A small team of infantry with a few missiles in a well-concealed position could take on a number of the largest and most expensive tanks. In the 1973 Yom Kippur War, Soviet first-generation wire-guided missiles employed by the Egyptian forces inflicted heavy casualties on Israeli tank units, causing a major crisis of confidence for tank designers.

Active protection systems, such as the Russian Arena active protection system, are becoming more common, with similar systems like the Israeli Iron Fist active protection system. The tank may be on the comeback because of active defense systems that intercept incoming projectiles in midair. This may allow the tank to be competitive on the battlefield once again.

=== Guns ===
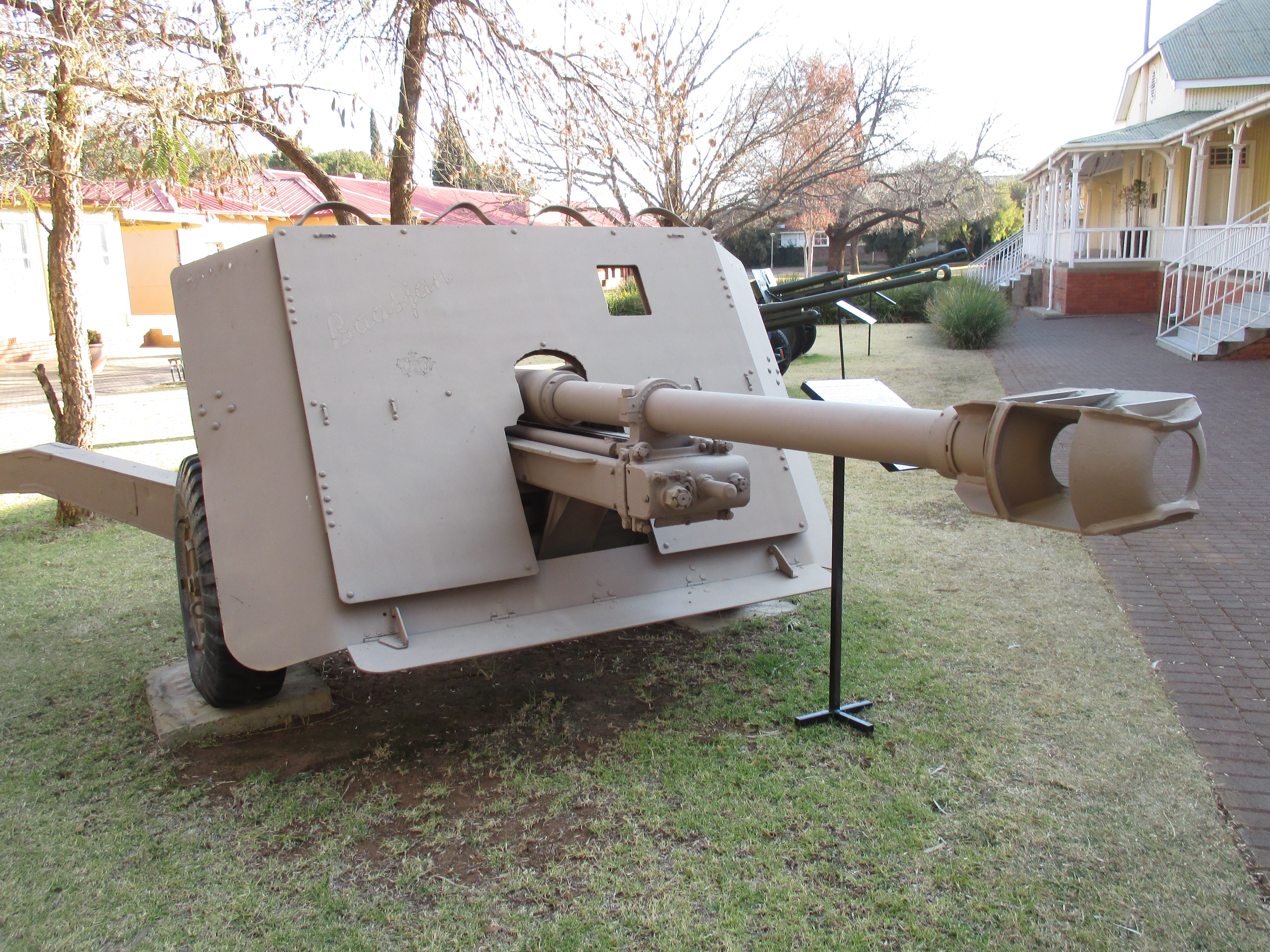
South African tank gun retrofitted to an OQF 17 pdr carriage.

Anti-tank guns continued to be used in several conflicts past World War 2 around the world, such as the Six-Day War and the South African Border War. Soviet anti-tank guns in particular were exported to at least eighteen other countries after being retired from service and have continued to see action.

Rather than developing specialized anti-tank artillery, some nations, including South Africa and Israel, mounted obsolete tank guns on towed carriages for that role.

=== Mines ===
Owing to the greater sophistication of the tank and the engineering support available to tank units to detect and negate minefields, considerable effort was made to develop more effective anti-tank mine technology to deny tank-led formations maneuver space or channel their movement into unsuitable avenues of approach.

=== Infantry ===
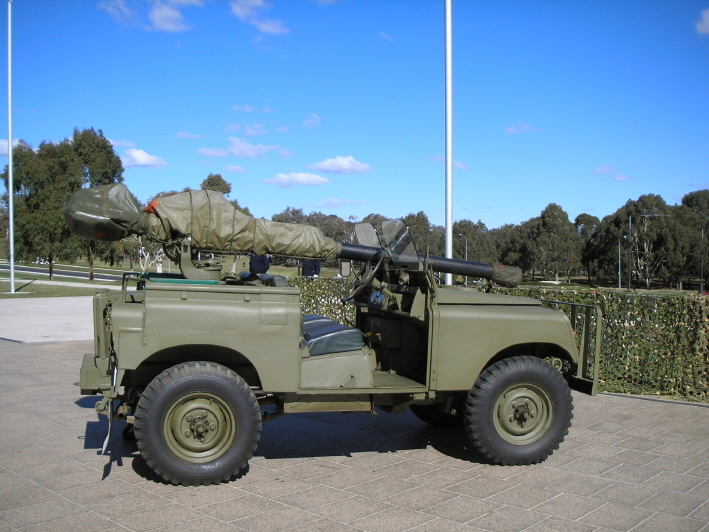
Australian Army Land Rover Series 2 "gunbuggy" with an M40 recoilless rifle used in the anti-tank role

The search for a more suitable, longer-range delivery system took up much of the immediate post-war era. The US invested in the recoilless rifle, delivering a widely used 75 mm design, and less common 90 mm and 106 mm designs (the latter was usually mounted rather than infantry-handled). The 106 mm formed the basis of a dedicated anti-tank vehicle, the Ontos tank, which mounted six 106 mm rifles. The Australian Army also fitted M40 recoilless rifles to Land Rover Series 2 vehicles for use in an anti-tank role. The Soviet Union also built recoilless rifles in various calibers intended to be used as anti-tank weapons, most commonly 73 mm, 82 mm, and 110 mm (only the 73 mm remains in service with the Russian military today, though the other two can be found all over the world due to Soviet military aid during the Cold War). The British used a 120 mm (4.7 in) design to equip infantry units, the BAT series, which served from the 1950s until replaced by MILAN, but it was generally too heavy for infantry use and had to be towed by, or mounted on, a vehicle for maneuverability.

The Soviets developed the RPG-2 from the German Panzerfaust 150. Further development led to the ubiquitous RPG-7. The RPG-7 is one of the most widely used anti-tank weapons, favored most by soldiers of irregular militaries. The RPG-7 could fire a range of different warheads, from thermobaric warheads to one HEAT or tandem-charge HEAT warheads against explosive reactive armor equipped tanks. The RPG-7 has a long combat history and has been used in most wars, from the Vietnam War to present-day conflicts. In modern times, the RPG-7 is generally used in an urban environment, which would enhance its effectiveness due to the close ranges involved. However, the aging RPG-7 has evolved to the even more potent RPG-29 which has proven its worth in conflicts in the Middle East, damaging the Merkava IV, Challenger 2 and M1 Abrams main battle tanks.

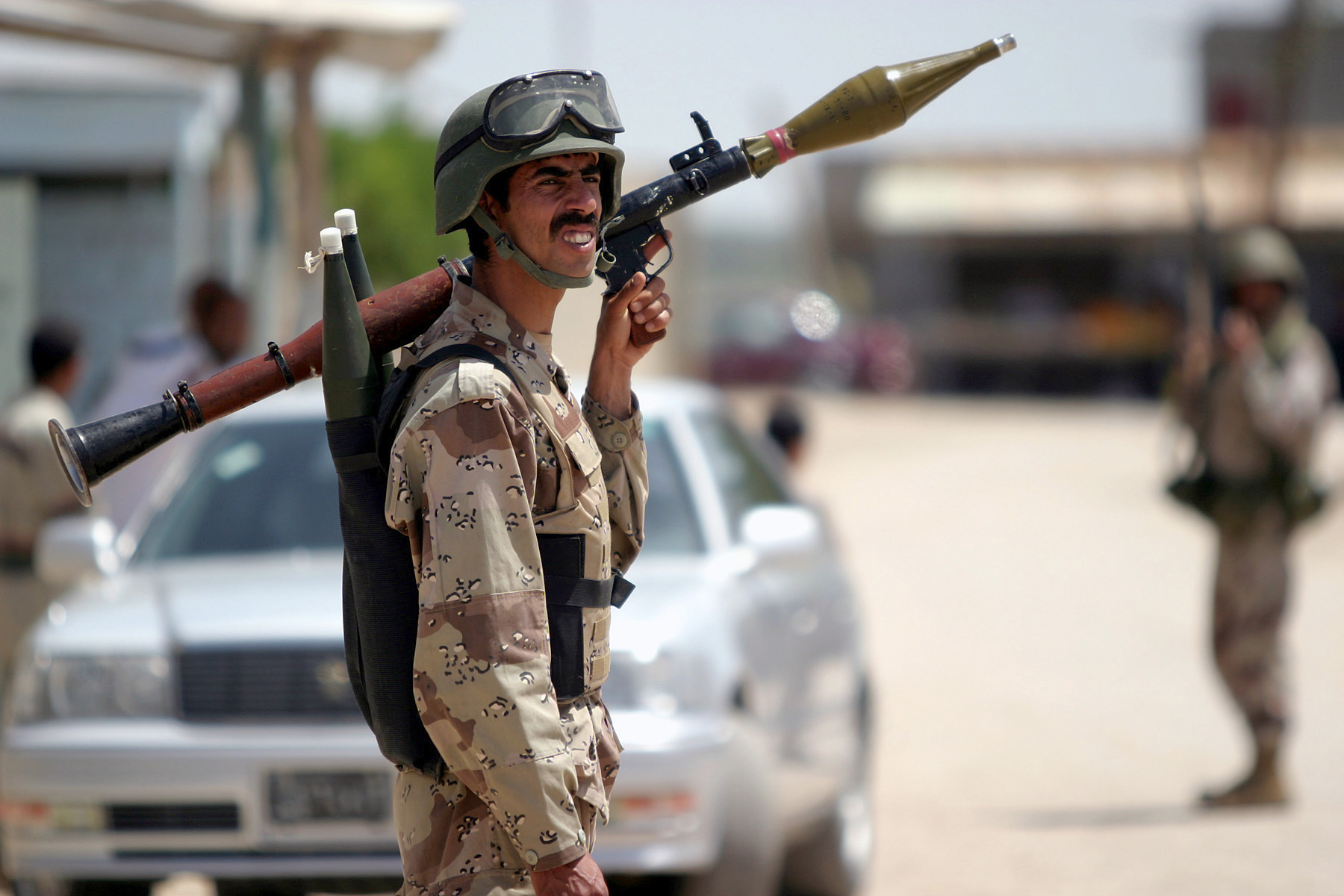
Soviet RPG-7

In the 1960s, the U.S. Army adopted the M72 LAW rocket, a lightweight, collapsible launcher capable of penetrating moderate thicknesses of enemy armor. During the Vietnam War, the weapon was used primarily against NVA and Viet Cong defensive works and emplacements, as there were few encounters against enemy armor. Overall, the LAW was regarded as a success, though its ignition system frequently misfired in the heat and humidity of the Vietnamese jungles. The LAW has since been replaced by the AT4 (M136).

=== Tactics ===
Changes in anti-tank tactics since the Second World War have mostly stemmed from the emergence of new technologies and the increased firepower of infantry mounted on fully armored vehicles. The most profound anti-tank technology has been the guided missile, which, when coupled with a helicopter, can enable engagement of tanks beyond ground line of sight (LOS) and at one of their most vulnerable aspects: the top armor.

== Effectiveness ==
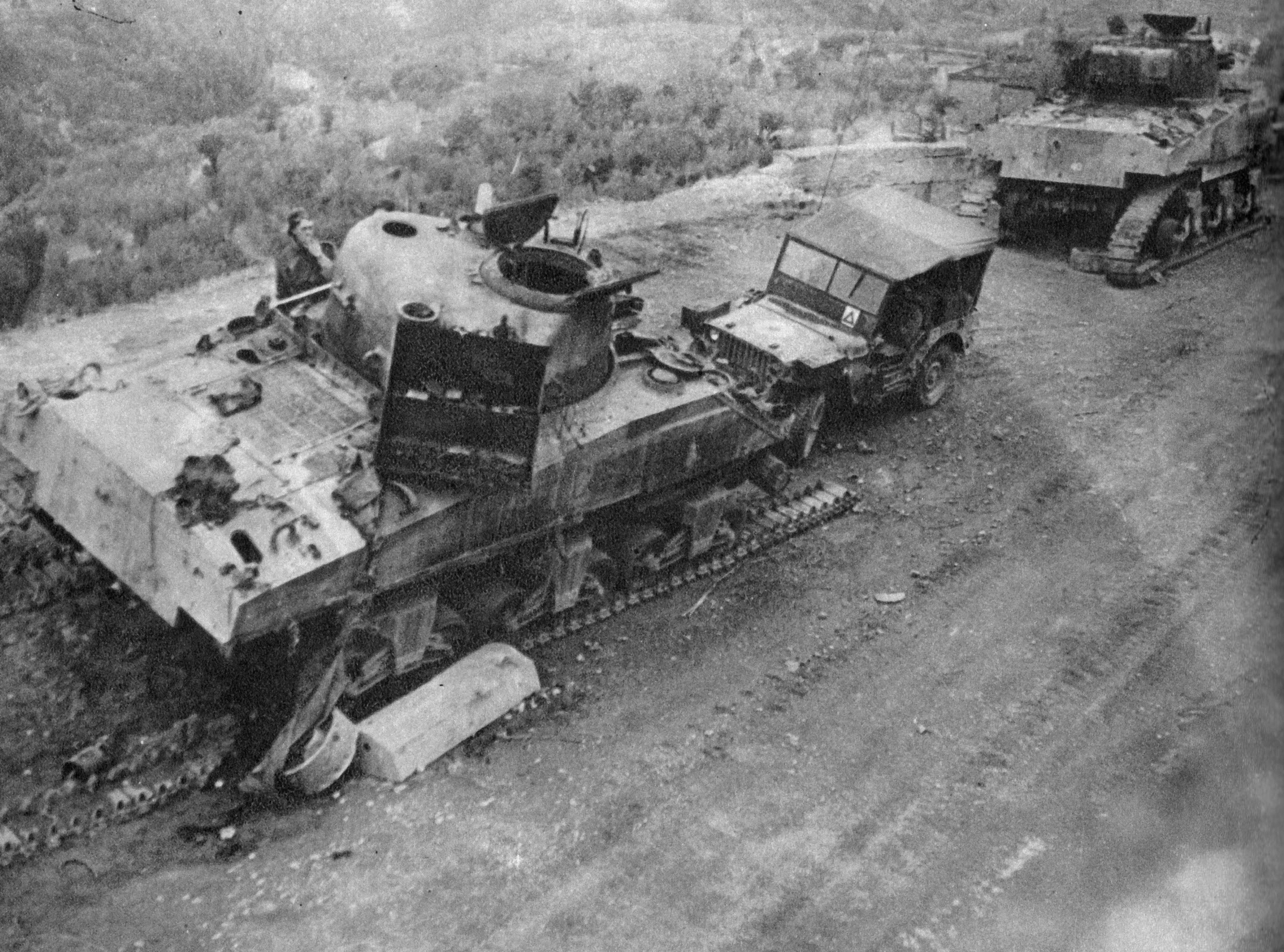
South African Sherman tanks disabled in the fight to take the Perugia Highlands in Italy 1944 – World War 2.

The effect of anti-tank warfare is to destroy or damage enemy tanks, or to prevent enemy tanks and their supporting troops from maneuvering, which is a tank's primary capability. In the US Army, the degree of effect by an anti-tank weapon on a vehicle is referred to as either "mobility kill", "firepower kill", or "catastrophic kill". In a mobility kill (M-kill), the vehicle loses its ability to move, for example, by breaking a tank track or bogey or damaging the engine; the targeted tank is then immobile, but may retain full use of its weapons (large cannon, heavy machine gun and smaller machine guns) and still be able to fight to some extent. However, a mobility-killed tank is a relatively vulnerable target to RPG or Molotov cocktail attacks, and it cannot maneuver to better firing positions.

A firepower kill (F-kill) is some loss of the vehicle's ability to fire its weapons. For example, a tank may be hit by a main cannon shot, rendering the main gun inoperable. M-kills and F-kills may be complete or partial, the latter corresponding to reductions in a target's ability to move or fire. A catastrophic kill (K-kill) removes the tank's ability to fight; this may entail destroying the tank or disabling or killing the crew.

=== Current trends ===
Although the future of the tank was questioned in the 1960s due to the development of anti-tank missiles, increases in thickness and composition of armor, and other improvements in tank design meant that infantry-operated systems were no longer sufficiently effective by the 1970s. The introduction of Chobham armor by the British Army and reactive armor by the Soviet Army forced HEAT rounds to be enlarged, rendering them less portable.

Weapon systems like the RPG-29 Vampir and FGM-148 Javelin use a tandem warhead where the first warhead disables reactive armor, while the second warhead defeats the shell armor by means of a HEAT or a shaped charge. Today, the anti-tank role is filled with a variety of weapons, such as portable top attack artillery ammunition and missiles, larger HEAT missiles fired from ground vehicles and helicopters, a variety of high velocity autocannon, and ever-larger and heavier tank guns. One of the first lessons of the 2006 Israel-Lebanon conflict is the effectiveness of portable rocket-propelled grenades, in particular, Russian-made RPG-29, and Metis-M, Kornet, and European MILAN anti-tank missiles.

== See also ==
- List of man portable anti-tank systems
- Anti-tank grenade
- Bumbar
- Czech hedgehog
- List of anti-tank guns
- Anti-tank obstacles
