= Catastrophic kill =

Type of armored vehicle destruction

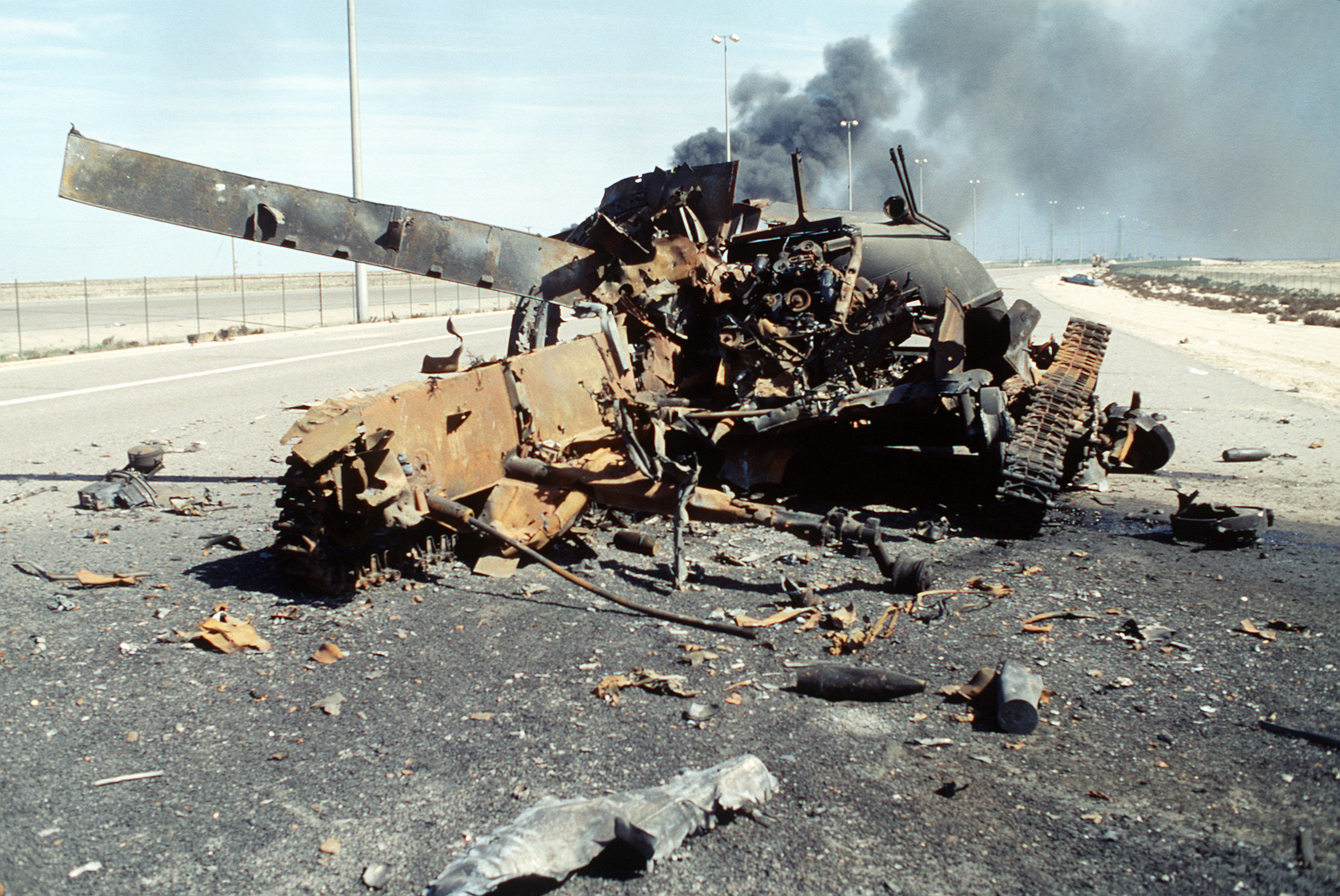
Iraqi T-54/T-55 on the Gulf War's "Highway of Death" in 1991. The rear of the tank has been blown away, making it irreparable.

A catastrophic kill, K-Kill or complete kill is damage inflicted on an armored vehicle that renders it permanently non-functional (most commonly via fire and/or an explosion).

Among tank crewmen it is also commonly known as a brew-up, coined from the British World War II term for lighting a fire in order to brew tea. The expression arose because British troops used an old petrol tin with holes punched in the side as a makeshift stove on which to brew their tea. The flames licking out of the holes in the side of the tin resembled a burning tank, and thus the expression was coined.

Typically, a catastrophic kill results in the ignition of any fuel the vehicle may be carrying as well as the detonation (cooking off, or sympathetic detonation) of its ammunition. A catastrophic kill does not necessarily preclude the survival of the vehicle's crew, although most historical casualties in armored warfare were the result of K-kills.

This type of kill is also associated with the jack-in-the-box effect, where a tank's turret is blown skyward due to the overpressure of an ammunition explosion. Some tank designs employ blow-off panels, channeling such explosions outside of the vehicle, turning an otherwise catastrophic kill into a firepower kill.

By contrast, the term knocked out refers to a vehicle which has been damaged to the point of inoperability and abandoned by its crew, but is not obviously beyond the point of repair. A knocked-out vehicle may, however, be later determined to be irreparable and written off.

== See also ==
- Mobility kill
- Firepower kill
- Mission kill
