= Cooking off =

Premature explosion of ammunition

Cooking off (or thermally induced firing) is unfired weapon ammunition exploding prematurely due to heat in the surrounding environment. The term is used both for detonation of ammunition not loaded into a weapon, and unintended firing of a loaded weapon due to heating.

A fast cook-off is a cook-off caused by fire. A slow cook-off is caused by a sustained thermal event less intense than fire.

A cooked-off round may cause a sympathetic detonation of adjacent rounds. Insensitive munitions are designed to be less vulnerable to accidental firing induced by external heat.

== Artillery ==
Inherent design flaws in early 17th century Swedish leather cannons led to the gun tube overheating which prematurely ignited the gunpowder, injuring the loader.

Muzzle-loading cannon on merchant and naval vessels of the Age of Sail would fire if the vessels caught fire while the guns were loaded. Examples include the merchantman Earl Fitzwilliam and HMS Queen Charlotte.

After the cooking off of artillery shells in the G5 howitzers in the late 1980s, the South African Army changed commands from "cease fire" to "cease loading". This allowed crews to fire any loaded shells to prevent them from heating up and exploding.

== Machine guns ==
Cooking off is a characteristic of certain air-cooled machine guns firing from a closed bolt. In such a design, when the trigger is released the weapon feed leaves a final round in the chamber. Residual heat conducts through the cartridge case. If the kindling point of the propellant is eventually reached it will burn even though the primer has not been struck, thus firing the chambered round. Nitrocellulose, the primary component of modern smokeless powder, has a relatively low autoignition temperature of around 160–170 °C (320–338 °F). Contrary to popular myth, this will not cause the machine gun to "runaway" at cyclic rate of fire (as compared to a slamfire) because each chambered round has to first be brought up to temperature. The time this takes depends on the temperature of the chamber and of the environment, but is usually several seconds, although if caused deliberately may be very fast. During this time the barrel is cooling.

Cook offs in machine guns are prevented by:

- Cased ammunition: Among its many functions, the metallic cartridge case acts as a heat sink protecting the propellant from chamber heat. The case must first be brought up to temperature before the propellant inside can burn.
- Cooling: Barrels can be liquid-cooled (like a radiator in an automobile engine), or exchanged periodically. Most modern infantry machine guns (GPMG, general-purpose machine gun) are issued with several quick change barrels that are swapped out allowing one barrel to cool while the gun fires with the other.
- Open bolt: Most modern infantry machine guns (and submachine guns) fire from an open bolt, meaning the bolt remains to the rear when the trigger is released. Pulling the trigger releases the bolt forward and fires the weapon simultaneously. Assuming proper operation (no stoppages) a cook off is not possible with this design because a cartridge is not chambered until the moment the trigger is pulled and the weapon is fired, thus there is nothing in the chamber.

=== Closed bolt ===
Most modern infantry assault rifles fire from a closed bolt, meaning that when ready to fire, there is a round in the chamber of the barrel and the bolt and working parts are in the forward position, closing the breech. Squeezing the trigger releases the striker or hammer, firing the cartridge in the chamber. Assuming proper operation (no stoppages) a cook off is possible with this design because a cartridge is kept chambered in the potentially hot chamber, where it can absorb enough heat to cause ignition of its propellant. Apart from the possibility to cook off the heated propellant requires a special formula to allow for consistent muzzle velocity throughout all temperatures.

=== Caseless ammunition ===
Caseless ammunition eliminates the metal case that typically holds the primer or igniter and the powder charge (smokeless powder) that propels the bullet. The metal case absorbs a large portion of the waste heat of firing. Ejecting this hot, empty case removes that heat from the weapon. With caseless rounds, other means of reducing waste heat are necessary, especially in automatic fire.

== Tanks ==
Cooking off is a serious hazard to crews in damaged and disabled tanks. Attempted solutions include storing ammunition under water and insulating ammunition compartments. The current technique, used in tanks such as the M1 Abrams, is to armor the compartments and provide blow-off panels to channel the force of the explosion to the exterior of the tank and prevent the jack-in-the-box effect.

== Missiles and air-dropped bombs ==
The risk of aircraft armament cooking off is a significant hazard during pre-flight operations, especially for aircraft carriers. Fuel fires, which can spread across the flight deck rapidly and engulf many aircraft, are the most serious risk. This was a significant contributor to the 1967 fire disaster aboard the USS Forrestal, when such a fire (set off by an inadvertently fired Zuni rocket striking the fuel tanks of a waiting A-4 Skyhawk) detonated two unguided bombs of Korean War vintage which had been loaded onto the stricken bomber, rupturing the fuel tanks of adjacent aircraft and setting off a chain reaction of similarly cooked off bombs. Because of the age and condition of the first two bombs, the fire safety crew was unable to cool them before they cooked off, which should have been possible for contemporary weapons with higher cook-off temperatures.

A different sort of cook-off event was the trigger for the 1969 explosion and fire aboard the USS Enterprise (CVN-65), which also involved a Zuni rocket. During this event, the exhaust from an MD-3A "Huffer" Air Start Unit (ASU) overheated the warhead of a Zuni that was mounted on a parked aircraft, causing it to cook off. As with the Forrestal disaster, this led to procedural and equipment changes, specifically regarding ASUs.

== See also ==
- Glossary of firearms terms
