= Mobility kill =

Military tactic and the state of an armoured vehicle being immobilised

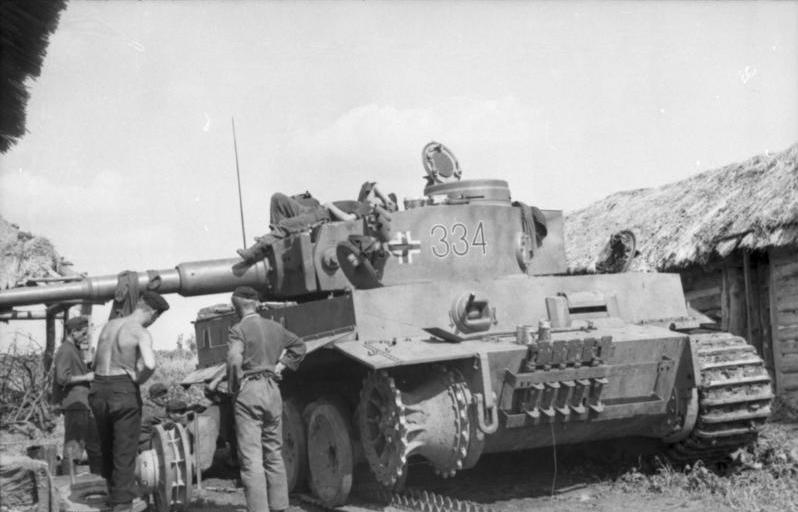
Tiger tank disabled by an anti-tank mine during the Battle of Kursk seen under repair, 1943

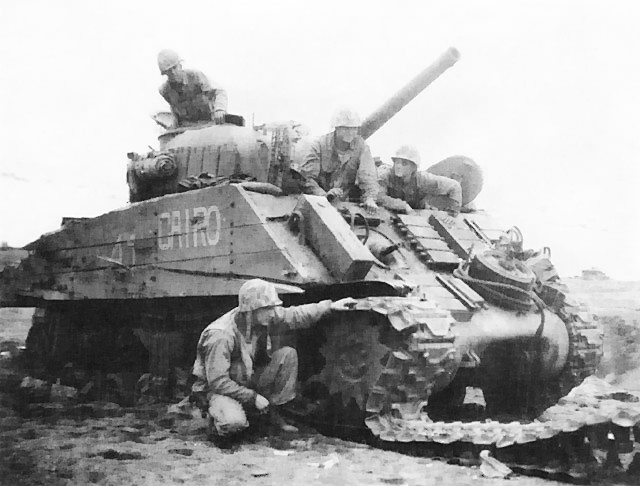
M4 Sherman disabled by an anti-tank mine and five hits from Japanese artillery during the Battle of Iwo Jima, 1945

A mobility kill (also abbreviated as M-kill) in armoured warfare is a vehicle that is immobilised due to damage or anti-tank obstacles, or the act of immobilising such a target through damage or anti-tank obstacles. This is often caused by the vehicle triggering an anti-tank mine with its tracks or wheels. However, it may also result from direct hits by rocket propelled grenades, anti-tank missiles, and other direct and indirect fire rounds, or though anti-tank obstacles like dragons teeth, anti-tank ditches, Czech hedgehogs, and other such obstacles.

Tanks and other armoured fighting vehicles can be immobilised by damage to their engines, tracks, or running gears, or by getting stuck on, or in, anti-tank obstacles. Because of the mobile nature of modern warfare, such a vehicle is often effectively useless and particularly vulnerable on the battlefield, though it may later be salvaged for spares, or repaired or unstuck and brought back into action. In rare cases, tanks that have suffered mobility kills have continued to engage enemy targets with their main gun and secondary armaments, even though they are immobile. However, in an active battlefield situation, any armoured fighting vehicles which have suffered mobility kills are stationary targets for ground-attack planes armed with ordnance such as rockets or cluster bombs. Alternatively they may be subject to artillery bombardment or a drone attack. Enemy ground troops may attack stranded vehicles with additional ATGMs or RPGs. If the vehicle is later destroyed after becoming a mobility kill, it will instead be classed as a catastrophic kill (also abbreviated as K-Kill).

== See also ==
- Firepower kill
- Mission kill
- Catastrophic kill (K-Kill)
