= Sympathetic detonation =

Detonation caused by a nearby explosion

A sympathetic detonation (SD, or SYDET), also called flash over or secondary/secondaries (explosion), is a detonation, usually unintended, of an explosive charge by a nearby explosion.

== Definition ==
A sympathetic detonation is caused by a shock wave, or impact of primary or secondary blast fragments.

The initiating explosive is called the donor explosive, the initiated one is known as the receptor explosive. In case of a chain detonation, a receptor explosive can become a donor one.

The shock sensitivity, also called gap sensitivity, which influences the susceptibility to sympathetic detonations, can be measured by gap tests.

If detonators with primary explosives are used, the shock wave of the initiating blast may set off the detonator and the attached charge. However even relatively insensitive explosives can be set off if their shock sensitivity is sufficient. Depending on the location, the shock wave can be transported by air, ground, or water. The process is probabilistic, a radius with 50% probability of sympathetic detonation often being used for quantifying the distances involved.

Sympathetic detonation presents problems in storage and transport of explosives and ordnance. Sufficient spacing between adjacent stacks of explosive materials has to be maintained. In case of an accidental detonation of one charge, other ones in the same container or dump can be detonated as well, but the explosion should not spread to other storage units. Special containers attenuating the shock wave can be used to prevent the sympathetic detonations; epoxy-bonded pumice liners were successfully tested. Blow-off panels may be used in structures, e.g. tank ammunition compartments, to channel the explosion overpressure in a desired direction to prevent a catastrophic failure.

Other factors causing unintended detonations are e.g. flame spread, heat radiation, and impact of fragmentation.

A related term is cooking off, setting off an explosive by subjecting it to sustained heat of e.g. a fire or a hot gun barrel. A cooked-off explosive may cause sympathetic detonation of adjacent explosives.

== Military ==
Sympathetic detonations may occur in munitions stored in e.g. vehicles, ships (called a Magazine Explosion), gun mounts, or ammunition depot, by a sufficiently close explosion of a projectile or a bomb. Such detonations after receiving a hit have caused many catastrophic losses of vehicles.

To prevent sympathetic detonations, minimal distances (specific for a given type of the mine) have to be maintained between mines when laying a minefield.

Spallation of materials after an impact on the opposite side may create fragments capable of causing sympathetic detonations of stored explosives on the opposite side of an armour plate or a concrete wall. Transfer of the shock wave through the wall or armour may also be possible cause of a sympathetic detonation.

Class 1.1 solid rocket fuels are susceptible to sympathetic detonation. Conversely, class 1.3 fuels can be ignited by a nearby fire or explosion, but are generally not susceptible to sympathetic detonation. Class 1.1 fuels, however, tend to have slightly higher specific impulses, and therefore are used in those military applications where weight and/or size is at a premium, e.g. on ballistic and cruise missile submarines.

Sympathetic detonation can be used for the destruction of unexploded ordnance, improvised explosive devices, land mines, or naval mines by an adjacent bulk charge.

Special insensitive explosives, such as TATB, are used in certain military applications to avoid sympathetic detonations.

=== Examples ===
During the Attack of Pearl Harbor, the USS Arizona was struck with an armor-piercing bomb which penetrated the upper deck and stopped inside the forward magazine. The bomb triggered an explosion which was powerful enough to cut the Arizona in half and is considered a sympathetic detonation as there was an apparent delay between the detonation of the bomb and the contents of the forward magazine.

Sympathetic detonation killed 320 sailors and injured 390 others in the Port Chicago Disaster of July 17, 1944 at the Port Chicago Naval Magazine in Port Chicago, California.

During the 1967 USS Forrestal fire, eight old Composition B based iron bombs cooked off. The last one caused a sympathetic detonation of a ninth bomb, a more modern and less cookoff-susceptible Composition H6 based one.

The Russian submarine Kursk explosion was probably caused by a sympathetic explosion of several torpedo warheads. A single dummy torpedo VA-111 Shkval exploded; 135 seconds later a number of warheads simultaneously exploded and sank the submarine.

Multiple incidents have been recorded in the more recent GWoT where airstrikes have set off explosives or ammunition caches in insurgent positions.

== Civilian ==
In rock blasting, sympathetic detonations occur when the blastholes are sufficiently close to each other, usually 24in or less, and especially in rocks that poorly attenuate the shock energy. Ground water in open channels facilitates sympathetic detonation as well. Blasthole spacing of 36in or more is suggested. However, in some ditch blasting cases sympathetic detonations are exploited purposefully. Nitroglycerine-based explosives are especially susceptible. Picric acid is sensitive as well. Water gel explosives, slurry explosives, and emulsion explosives tend to be insensitive to sympathetic detonations. For most industrial explosives, the maximum distances for possible sympathetic detonations are between 2–8 times of the charge diameter. Uncontrolled sympathetic detonations may cause excessive ground vibrations and/or flying rocks.

The spread of shock waves can be hindered by placing relief holes – drilled holes without explosive charges – between the blastholes.

The opposite phenomenon is dynamic desensitization (also called, Dead Pressing). Some explosives, e.g. ANFO, show reduced sensitivity under pressure. A transient pressure wave from a nearby detonation may compress the explosive sufficiently to make its initiation fail. This can be prevented by introducing sufficient delays into the firing sequence.

A sympathetic detonation during mine blasting may influence the seismic signature of the blast, by boosting the P-wave amplitude without significantly amplifying the surface wave.

== See also ==
- Cooking off
