= Explosion vent =

Safety device

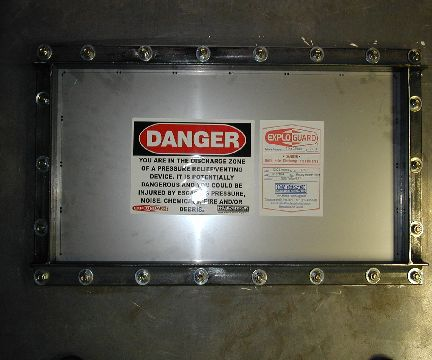
Explosion vent after installation

An explosion vent or rupture panel is a safety device to protect equipment or buildings against excessive internal, explosion-incurred pressures, by means of pressure relief. An explosion vent will relieve pressure from the instant its opening (or activation) pressure p_{stat} has been exceeded.

Several explosion vent panels can be installed on the same process vessel to be protected. Explosion vents are available in the versions self-destructive, non-self-re-closing and re-usable, self-re-closing.

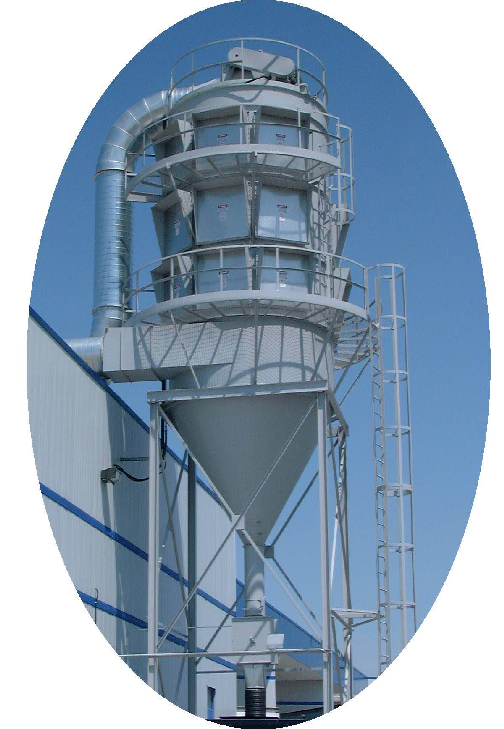
Explosion vents in service

Explosion vent construction must balance the contradictory requirements "low inertia" and "high strength". Inertia negatively affects an explosion vent's efficiency. High strength is required to endure the considerable forces that move the vent's venting element in order to open the venting orifice. Unintended disintegration must not cause disintegrating parts turning into a missile.

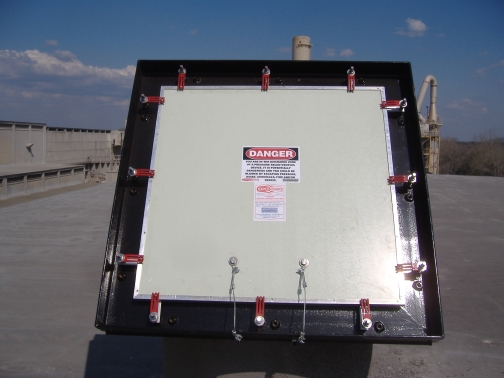
Discharge hood with explosion relief panels and fracture clip releases

The evaluation of an explosion vent's efficiency and its range of application are subject to rules. See National Fire Protection Association 68, EN 14797.

During normal venting, the explosion is freely discharged, allowing flames to exit the process being protected. When the protected vessel or pipe is located indoors, ducts are generally used to safely convey the explosion outside the building. However, ductwork has disadvantages and may result in decreased venting efficiency. Flameless venting, in combination with explosion vents, can extinguish the flame from the vented explosion without the use of expensive ducting, limitations to equipment location, or more costly explosion protection.

== Types ==
Being that these vents are used in the commercial industry there are many different types of variations that are used in each specific scenario. For example, they are sold in many different shapes like rectangles, squares and disks just to list the common shapes used. They are typically affixed by being bolted or welded around the edge of the panel. The different types of explosion vents and they typical applications/style of vent are listed below.

1. VSP/VSS- best for vacuum/vacuum cycling
2. VSM- dust collectors/cyclones and conveyors
3. VSP-L- low pressure below 1/3psi
4. VSE- near static atmosphere
5. VSP- very low pressure
6. EXP- flat vent 316ss
7. EXP-V- vacuum conditions
8. EXP-DV- vacuum conditions
9. LCV- flat vent made of composite material
10. HTV- high temperature conditions

== Aftermarket/other uses ==
Explosion vents similar to those in the commercial industry also used outside of the commercial industry; they are used in motorsports to do the same task in commercial settings. This technology has made its way into the aftermarket for engines in order to protect engine from basically destroying themselves. In the motorsports industry they are located on an engine more commonly on the back of the intake in order to protect from engine backfires. In the last couple of years engine technology has increased exponentially to the point to where now some engines can make in excess over a thousand horsepower. They work similar to those of the commercial side, they are a piece of sacrificial metal in the case of engine when a backfire occurs it will blow off the burst panel instead of blowing up the intake on the engine. In the case of the replacement cost the panel is around hundred dollars while an intake can cost up to a couple thousand dollars. In the motorsports industry the panel provides cheap insurance in order to protect the engine from itself.

== See also ==
- Blast damper
- Dust explosion
- Electrical equipment in hazardous areas
- Explosion protection
- Explosives safety
- Inert gas
- Pressure relief valve
- Pressure § Explosion or deflagration pressures
- Prestressed structure
- Rupture disc
