= Pressure Relief =

Pressure relief may refer to:

- stress management to relieve psychological stress on a human
- relieving excessive pressure forces to protect a mechanical system, typically using a pressure-relief device such as a safety valve or rupture disc
