= Blast damper =

Explosion protection technology

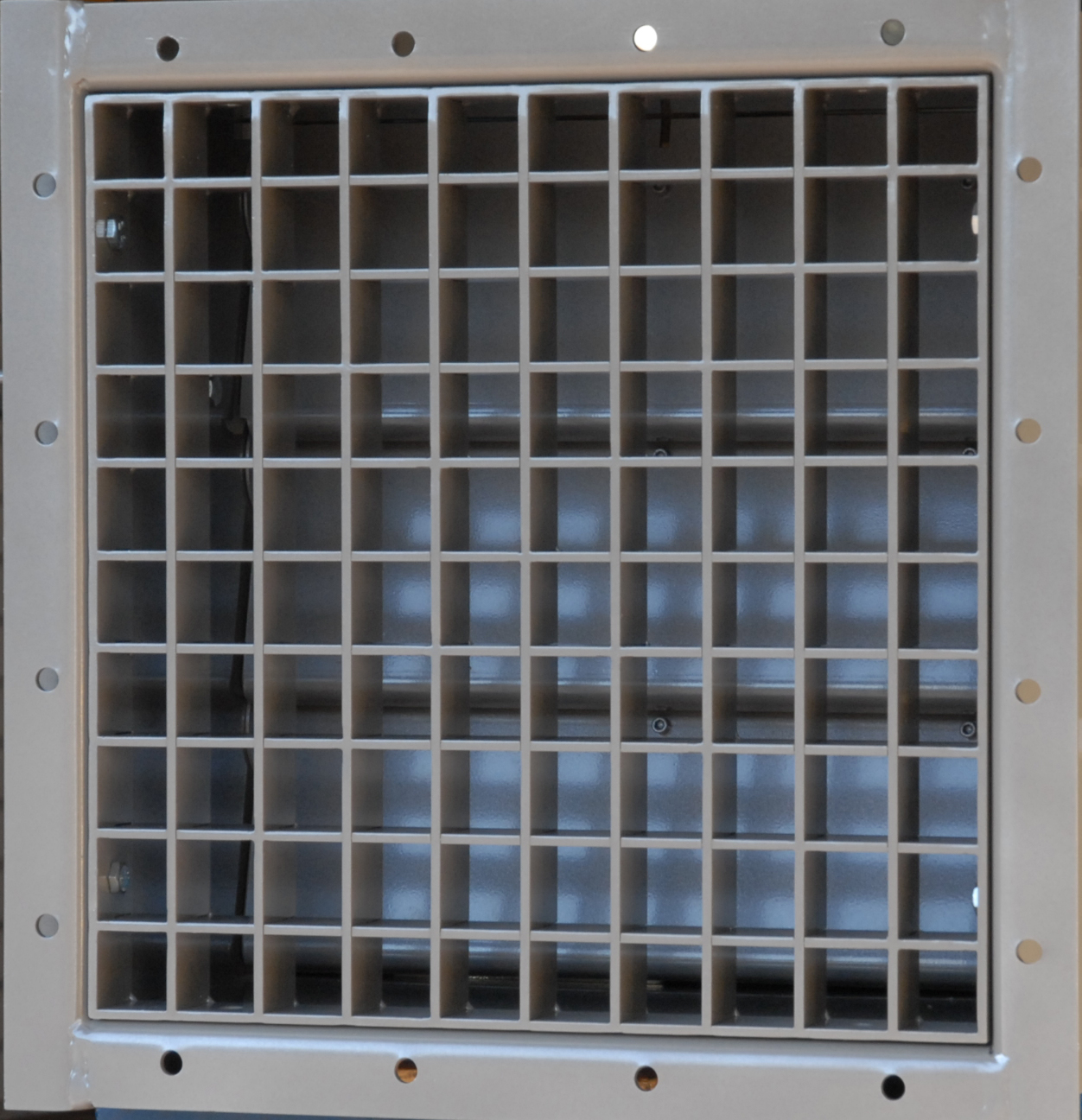
Blast Damper with integral grill to shield against flying objects

A blast damper is used to protect occupants and equipment of a structure against overpressures resultant of an explosion. The blast dampers normally protect air inlets and exhaust penetrations in an otherwise hardened structure. Blast dampers are related or identical to blast valves, the latter name is generally used to describe blast mitigation devices as they relate to nuclear explosions.

== Operation ==
Blast dampers usually employ some type of blade held open with tension from a spring. The damper blades close automatically when pressure overcomes the resistance offered by the spring. Various models differ in the amount of blast protection (e.g. 1 bar/14.5 psi or lower amounts of protection) and whether they stay closed after the blast or remain functional.

== Design ==
Typical blast dampers are sized to match HVAC ductwork and provide proper airflow with low pressure drop. Common applications include protecting equipment and personnel of control rooms and accommodation modules in petrochemical and industrial process facilities onshore and offshore. Acid- and corrosion-resistant versions are often requested in these instances.

== See also ==
- Explosion vent
- Fire damper
- Rupture disc
