= C8H20N2 =

The molecular formula C_{8}H_{20}N_{2} (molar mass: 144.26 g/mol, exact mass: 144.1626 u) may refer to:

- Octamoxin
- Octamethylenediamine(OMDA)
