= Explosion protection =

Explosion protection is used to protect all sorts of buildings and civil engineering infrastructure against internal and external explosions or deflagrations. It was widely believed until recently that a building subject to an explosive attack had a chance to remain standing only if it possessed some extraordinary resistive capacity. This belief rested on the assumption that the specific impulse or the time integral of pressure, which is a dominant characteristic of the blast load, is fully beyond control.

== Techniques ==
=== Avoidance ===
Avoidance makes it impossible for an explosion or deflagration to occur, for instance by means of suppressing the heat and the pressure needed for an explosion using an aluminum mesh structure such as eXess, by means of consistent displacement of the O_{2} necessary for an explosion or deflagration to take place, by means of padding gas (f. i. CO_{2} or N_{2}), or, by means of keeping the concentration of flammable content of an atmosphere consistently below or above the explosive limit, or by means of consistent elimination of ignition sources.

=== Constructional ===
Constructional explosion protection aims at pre-defined, limited or zero damage that results from applied protective techniques in combination with reinforcement of the equipment or structures that must be expected to become subject to internal explosion pressure and flying debris or external violent impact.

== Method selection ==
The technology of protection can range in price dramatically but where the type of device is rational to use, is typically from the least to the most expensive solution: explosion doors and vents (dependent on quantities and common denominators); inerting: explosion suppression; isolation – or combinations of same. To focus on the most cost effective, doors typically have lower release pressure capabilities; are not susceptible to fatigue failures or subject to changing release pressures with changes in temperature, as "rupture membrane" types are; capable of leak tight service; service temperatures of up to 2,000 °F; and can be more cost effective in small quantities. Rupture membrane type vents can provide a leak tight seal more readily in most cases; have a relatively broad tolerance on their release pressure and are more readily incorporated into systems with discharge ducts.

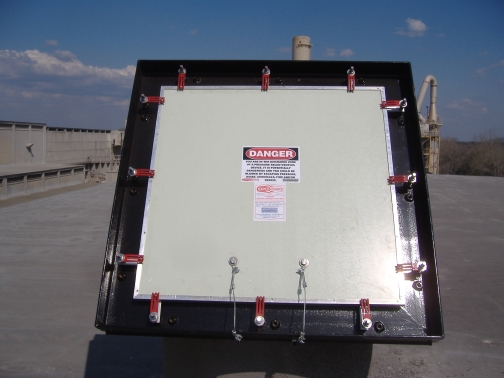
Discharge hood with explosion relief panels and fracture clip releases

There are several fundamental considerations in the review of a system handling potentially explosive dusts, gases or a mixture of the two. Dependent upon the design basis being used, often National Fire Protection Association Guideline 68, the definition of these may vary somewhat. To facilitate providing the reader with an appreciation of the issues rather than a design primer, the following have been limited to the major ones only.

== Database combustion and explosion characteristics of dusts ==
The database GESTIS-DUST-EX comprises important combustion and explosion characteristics of more than 7,000 dust samples from nearly all sectors of industry. It serves as a basis for the safe handling of combustible dusts and for the planning of preventive and protective measures against dust explosions in dust-generating and processing plants. The GESTIS-DUST-EX database is produced and maintained by the Institute for Occupational Safety and Health of the German Social Accident Insurance. It was elaborated in co-operation with other institutions and companies. The database is available free of charge to be used for occupational safety and health purposes.

== See also ==
- Explosion pressure
- Explosion prevention standards for electrical equipment
- Explosion vent
- Explosives safety
- Inert gas
- Pressure relief valve
- Prestressed structure
