= Surge control =

Surge control is the use of different techniques and equipment in a hydraulic system to prevent any excessive gain in pressure (also known as a pressure surge) that would cause the hydraulic process pressure to exceed the maximum working pressure of the mechanical equipment used in the system.

== What is hydraulic surge ==
Hydraulic surges are created when the velocity of a fluid suddenly changes and becomes unsteady or transient. Fluctuations in the fluid's velocity are generated by restrictions like a pump starting/stopping, a valve opening/closing, or a reduction in line size. Hydraulic surges can be generated within a matter of seconds anywhere that the fluid velocity changes and can travel through a pipeline at very high speed, damaging equipment or causing piping failures from over-pressurizing. Surge relief systems absorb and limit high-pressure surges, preventing the pressure surge from traveling through the hydraulic system. Devices for controlling hydraulic surges include gas-loaded surge relief valves, spring-loaded pressure safety valves, pilot-operated valves, surge suppressors, and rupture disks.

== Typical applications ==
Surge control products have been used in many industries to protect the maximum working pressure of hydraulic system for decades. Typical applications for surge relief equipment is in pipelines at pump stations, receiving manifolds at storage facilities, back pressure control, marine loading/off loading, site specific applications where pressure surges are generated by the automation system, or any location deemed critical by an engineering firm performing a surge analysis.

== Surge suppressors ==
Surge suppressors perform surge relief by acting as a pulsation dampener. Most suppressors have a metal tank with an internal elastic bladder in it. Within the tank they pressurize the top of the bladder with a compressed gas while the product comes in the bottom of the pressure vessel. The gas in the bladder is supplying the system with its set point. During normal operation, as the process conditions begins to build pressure; the internal bladder contracts from the pressure gain allowing liquid to move into the surge suppressor pressure vessel adding volume to the location. This increase in physical volume prevents the pressure from rising to dangerous levels.

Advantages:

- Very fast speed of response.
- Zero loss of product from the pipeline from a surge event.
- Can be used as both a surge suppressor and for surge relief.

Disadvantages:

- Limited capacity of volume for surge relief.
- The surge suppressor must be as physically close as possible to the area where the surge is generated. Surge suppressors can become very large depending on line size.
- Has a limited maximum working pressure.

== Rupture discs ==
A rupture disc, also known as a burst disc, bursting disc, or burst diaphragm, is a onetime use, non-resealing pressure relief device that, in most uses, protects a pressure vessel, equipment or system from over pressurization or potentially damaging vacuum conditions. A rupture disc is a sacrificial part because it has a one-time-use membrane that fails at a predetermined differential pressure, either positive or vacuum. The membrane is usually made out of metal, but nearly any material can be used to suit a particular application. Rupture discs provide instant response (within milliseconds) to an increase or decrease in system pressure, but once the disc has ruptured it will not reseal. Due to the one time usage of this disc it requires someone to replace the plate once it has ruptured. One time usage devices are initially cost-effective, but can become time-consuming and labor-intensive to repeatedly change out.

Advantages:

- Isolates equipment from the process conditions, protecting the equipment until it is needed for a surge relief event.
- Cost effective installation.
- Very fast response time.

Disadvantages:

- One time use.
- Requires down time to replace.
- A rupture disk has only one set point.
- Uncontrollable release of large amounts of harmful substances.

== Spring-loaded pressure safety valves ==
Spring-loaded pressure safety valves use a compressed spring to hold the valve closed. The valve will remain closed until the process pressure exceeds the set point of the spring pressure. The valve will open 100% when the set point is reached and will remain open until a certain blow down factor is reached. Oftentimes the blow down is a percentage of the set point, such as 20% of the set point. That means that the valve will remain open until the process pressure decreases to 20% below the set point of the spring-loaded relief valve.

Advantages:

- Opens 100% when set point is reached.
- Easy to install and maintain.
- High flow capacity or Cv value in gas service.

Disadvantages:

- Has a blow down factor inherent to the design of the valve.
- The spring takes a set, making the set point drift over time.
- May release product to atmosphere.

== Surge relief valves ==
Surge relief valves are known for their quick speed of response, excellent flow characteristics, and durability in high pressure applications. Surge relief valves are designed to have an adjustable set point that is directly related to the max pressure of the pipeline/system. When the product on the inlet of the valve exceeds the set point it forces the valve to open and allows the excess surge to be bled out in to a breakout tank or recirculated into a different pipeline. So in the event of the surge, the majority of the pressure is absorbed in the liquid and pipe, and just that quantity of liquid which is necessary to relieve pressures of unsafe proportions is discharged to the surge relief tank. Some valve manufactures use the piston style with a nitrogen control system and external plenums, while others use elastomeric tubes, external pilots, or internal chambers.

== Pilot operated valves ==
Pilot operated surge relief valves are typically used to protect pipelines that move low viscosity products like gasoline or diesel. This style of valve is installed downstream of the pump/valve that creates the surge. The valve is controlled by an external, normally closed pilot valve. The pilot will be set to the desired set point of the system, with a sense line that runs up stream of the valve. When the upstream process conditions start to exceed the pilot set point, the valve begins to open and relieve the excess pressure until the correct pressure is met causing the valve to close.

Advantages:

- Does not require power.
- Adjustable set point.
- High flow capacity or Cv value.

Disadvantages:

- Slower speed of response.
- Cannot be used in high viscosity applications.
- Pilot is sensitive to any type of particulate in the control loop.

== Gas loaded surge relief valves ==
Piston-style gas-loaded surge relief valves operate on the balanced piston design and can be used in a variety of applications because it can handle high and low viscosity products while maintaining a fast speed of response. An inert gas, most commonly nitrogen, is loaded on the back side of the piston forcing the valve closed. The nitrogen pressure on the back side of the piston is actually what determines the valves set point. These valves will remain closed until the inlet pressure exceeds the set point/nitrogen pressure, at which time the valve will open from the high pressure and remain open as long as the process pressure is above the nitrogen pressure. Once the process pressure starts to decay, the valve will start to close. Once the process pressure is below the nitrogen pressure, the valve will go closed again.

Advantages:

- Fast speed of response with soft closure to prevent generating a second surge event.
- Can be used on high viscosity products such as crude oil.
- Good flow characteristics (Cv).
- No blowout, resets at the set point.

Disadvantages:

- Only as repeatable as the system controlling the nitrogen pressure.
- Performance is greatly impacted by any restrictions in the gas line between the relief valve and the plenum tank.
- Many manufacturers recommend burring the plenum for temperature stability.

== Rubber boot-style gas-loaded relief valve ==
Rubber boot-style gas-loaded relief valves operate by using nitrogen pressure loaded on the outside diameter of a rubber boot that is covering the flow path through the relief valve. As long as the process pressure is below the nitrogen pressure, the valve is closed. As soon as the process pressure raises above the nitrogen pressure, the product in the line forces the rubber boot away from the barrier and allows product to pass through the valve. When the process pressure decreases below the nitrogen pressure, the valve goes closed again.

Advantages:

- There are many types of rubber elastomers for many different types of products.
- Fast speed of response when the rubber boot isn't cold.
- Achieves positive seal even when there is minor particulate in the line.

Disadvantages:

- Rubber boot is greatly affected by temperature, the lower the temperature the less repeatable the relief valve set point.
- Poor flow characteristics (Low Cv) require larger valves to achieve the desired flow rates.
- Replacing the rubber boot requires the valve be removed from the line to be disassembled.
- Current generation valves have metal internals and do not use older generation Rubber Boot.

== Controlling surge relief valves ==
There are many different approaches to controlling surge relief equipment. It all starts with the technology used in the specific application. Spring-loaded pressure safety valves and pilot-operated valves are controlled mechanically using the pressure from a compressed spring. Typically there is an adjustment stem that allows for minor adjustments on the set point by compressing or decompressing the spring. This design is limited by the pressure that can be generated by the spring in the valve.

Gas-loaded relief valves are controlled by the nitrogen pressure loaded into the relief valve. If there is no control on the nitrogen pressure, then the nitrogen gas will expand and contract with the changing ambient temperature. As the nitrogen pressure drifts with the temperature so does the set point of the relief valve.

The nitrogen pressure has traditionally been controlled using mechanical regulators. Regulators are designed to operate under flowing conditions. When used in the closed end plenum system of a surge relief valve, it must also perform an on/off function to correct for thermal expansion and contraction. Being a pressure control device designed for use under flowing conditions, it is not well suited to perform the on/off function needed in a closed-end system such as a surge relief valve plenum.

Another common issue is that regulators are required to operate outside of their design limits when making the corrections needed for thermal expansion and contraction. The volume of gas required to be added or vented from the system is so small that the regulator is required to operate below the minimum threshold of its performance curve. As a result, inconsistent corrections are made to the system pressure which impact the gas-loaded relief valve's set point.

An accurate and reliable approach to controlling the nitrogen pressure on a gas-loaded surge relief valve is to use an electronic control system to add and vent nitrogen pressure from the gas-loaded surge relief valve. This technique assures the required set point accuracy and repeatability needed in this critical application.

== See also ==
- Surge tank
- Pressure relief valve
- Safety relief valve
