= Explosives safety =

Safety practices related to explosives

A video on safety when using explosives in the workplace

Explosives safety refers to the practices taken during the use of explosives to prevent injury or death. Explosives include chemicals such as TNT or dynamite as well as other kinds of explosives, such as land mines, C-4s, and IEDs.

Explosions are sudden, rapid releases of energy that produces potentially damaging pressures. Explosions can result from ignition events involving energetic materials, a pressurisation event, or a chemical reaction.

== Hazards ==
=== Toxicity ===
A number of explosives contain chemical compounds which can be toxic, either released as products or contained within the explosive itself.

== Quantity-distance (QD) ==
Quantity-distance (QD) is the foundation of DOD explosives safety standards. It defines levels of protection from blast based on relationships between the Net Explosive Weight (NEW) of explosive material and distance from that material. The relationships are based on levels of risk considered acceptable for specific exposures but they do not provide absolute safety or protection. Exposures are expressed by a “K-factor” (K6, K18, etc.) which represents the degree of protection provided; higher is better. K328 equates to a blast overpressure of 0.0655 psi (452 Pa) which will not harm people in the open. The relationship between QD, NEW and K-factor is defined by $\sqrt[3]{NEW}\times K factor = QD$ where NEW is given in pounds, QD is given in feet, and K-factor is given in $ft\times lb^3$ but is typically expressed as a unitless value.

== Blast wave phenomena ==
A blast wave phenomenon is an incident involving the violent release of energy created by detonation of an explosive device. The sudden and intense pressure disturbance is termed the “blast wave.” The blast wave is characterized by an almost instantaneous rise from ambient pressure to a peak incident pressure (Pi). This pressure increase or “shock front,” travels radially outward from the detonation point, with a diminishing velocity that is always in excess of the speed of sound in that medium. Gas molecules making up the front move at lower velocities. This velocity, which is called the “particle velocity,” is associated with the “dynamic pressure,” or the pressure formed by the winds produced by the shock front. As the shock front expands into increasingly larger volumes of the medium, the incident pressure decreases and, generally, the duration of the pressure-pulse increases. If the shock wave strikes a rigid surface (e.g., a building) at an angle to the direction of the wave's propagation, a reflected pressure is instantly developed on the surface and this pressure rises to a value that exceeds the incident pressure. This reflected pressure is a function of the incident wave's pressure and the angle formed between the rigid surface and the plane of the shock front.

== Fragments ==
An important consideration in the analysis of the hazards associated with an explosion is the effect of any fragments produced. Although fragmentation most commonly occurs in high explosives events, fragmentation may occur in any incident involving ammunition and explosives (A&E). Depending on their origin, fragments are referred to as “primary” or “secondary” fragments.

Primary fragments result from the shattering of a container (e.g., shell casings, kettles, hoppers, and other containers used in the manufacture of explosives and rocket engine housings) in direct contact with the explosive. These fragments usually are small, initially travel at thousands of feet per second, and may be lethal at long distances from an explosion.

Secondary fragments are debris from structures and other items in close proximity to the explosion. These fragments, which are somewhat larger in size than primary fragments and initially travel at hundreds of feet per second, do not normally travel as far as primary fragments.

== Thermal hazards ==
Generally, thermal hazards from explosives events are of less concern than blast and fragment hazards. With the release of energy from an explosion is heat. The amount of heat varies with the energetic compound (explosive). All explosives compound molecules are potentially unstable held together with weak bonds in their outer shell. When this weak bond is broken heat and energy is violently released. It normally takes longer for the thermal blast to incur. Injury from thermal effects follows the blast and fragmentation effects which happen almost instantaneously. This does not imply that there is a time lapse between blast and fragmentation effects of explosives; in fact it happens so fast that humans cannot notice the delay without specialized equipment. The time available to react to a thermal event does increases survivability by rapid equipment designed to react in a fragment of a second. The primary effect of the thermal effect from an explosive detonation on structures, material, and ammunition and explosives (A&E) is their partial or total destruction by fire. The primary concern for explosives safety with a fire involving A&E is that it may transition to a more severe reaction, causing detonations of additional or more hazardous explosives devises and placing more people or property at a greater degree of risk of damage, destruction, injury, or death.

== Susan test ==
Following the 1966 Palomares B-52 crash and the 1968 Thule Air Base B-52 crash, accident investigators concluded that the conventional explosives used at the time in nuclear weapons were not stable enough to withstand the forces involved in an aircraft accident. The finding triggered research by scientists in the United States into safer conventional explosives that could be used in nuclear weapons. The Lawrence Livermore National Laboratory developed the "Susan Test" — a standard test that uses a special projectile whose design simulates an aircraft accident by squeezing and nipping explosive material between metal surfaces. The test projectile is fired under controlled conditions at a hard surface to measure the reactions and thresholds of different explosives to an impact.

== Explosives safety specialist ==
An explosives safety specialist is a highly trained and skilled civilian professional usually a QASAS or a Safety Specialist that has been trained to evaluate risk and hazards involved with conventional, guided missiles and toxic chemical ammunition operations. Department of Defense Standards requires that only trained and certified personnel are permitted to participate in operations involving ammunition, explosives, and/or explosive components, guided missiles, and toxic chemicals. They are responsible for providing protection from the effects of ammunition and explosives by evaluation of a set of standards developed by the Department of Defense and reinforced by additional regulations by the branch of military service responsible for the explosives item.

They develop safety programs to minimize losses due to injuries and property damage. They try to eliminate unsafe practices and conditions on sites where ammunition and explosives (A&E) are used or stored. Military explosives safety specialist are deployed along with U.S. Military forces to maintain safe storage and use of A&E. They are responsible to recommend to military command ways to store A&E that reduce the risk of injury or death to service men and women in case of an accidental detonation or if the A&E supply is hit by enemy attack.

Much of the work of military explosives safety specialist is identical to their civilian counterparts. They have offices where they analyze data and write reports to upper commands on the storage of A&E. Much of their time is spent reviewing or preparing explosives safety site plans. An explosives site plan (ESS) is the composite risk management (CRM) process associated with explosives/toxic chemical activities to ensure the minimum risk to personnel, equipment, and assets, while meeting mission requirements. The damage or injury potential of explosions is determined by the separation distance between potential explosion sites (PES) and exposed sites (ES); the ability of the PES to suppress blast overpressure, primary and secondary fragments; and the ability of the ES to resist explosion effects. Planning for the proper location and construction of A&E facilities and surrounding facilities exposed to A&E facilities is a key element of the explosives/toxic chemical site planning process. This management process also ensures that risks above those normally accepted for A&E activities are identified and approved at the proper level of command.

Explosives Safety Specialist must often travel to different storage sites to verify that the military installation is meeting the service explosives safety regulations.

Explosives Safety Specialist often works with other safety professionals. They are required to know OSHA, EPA, NFPA and other consensus standards when looking at safety and if these regulations are stricter than their service regulation they must apply these standards and regulations. They must also know Alcohol, Tobacco, and Firearms (ATF) regulations dealing with A&E and apply those standards if it is required. They must be able to convince people the need for following prescribes explosives safety standards/regulations. They must also work with ammunition cleanup sites insuring that safety laws and regulations as well as industry standards are followed. They should be good at solving problems.

The military is not the only industry to use explosives safety specialist but are by far the largest employer. Mining and construction also use explosives safety specialist to evaluate hazard and risk from explosives and blasting operations. Ammunition and explosives manufactures also use these professionals. Outside the military explosives safety specialist must apply and be knowledgeable of ATF, OSHA, EPA, NFPA, as well as state and local regulations dealing with safety of A&E.

== See also ==
- Explosion protection
- Explosion vent
- Explosive material
- Explosives shipping classification system
