= Blast valve =

Valve to protect against sudden air pressure changes

A blast valve is used to protect a shelter, such as a fallout shelter or bunker, from the effects of sudden outside air pressure changes. A nuclear weapon creates a shock wave, which may produce sudden pressure changes of more than an atmosphere (about 1 bar) even several kilometres from the detonation point. After the shock wave passes, a sudden negative pressure follows.

If such pressure waves enter a shelter, they will likely do substantial harm to occupants and equipment. A blast valve is placed in air intake/exhaust pipes, that remains open normally, but automatically closes when strong pressure is applied in either direction. Blast dampers operate in the same fashion and are related or identical to blast valves, the former name however is generally used to describe blast mitigation devices, for more conventional explosive events.

A typical blast valve has entries of 15–30 cm diameter, and a larger centre section. Within the centre section is a disk mounted on an axle, with weak springs that keep it centred, away from both entries. Pressure displaces the disk along the axle, until it plugs one entry or the other. After the blast, the springs return the disk to the centre, re-opening the valve.

Another type of blast valve employs rounded metal tubes held in place by springs. As pressure rises it pushes the tubes against the frame of the valve closing the opening. These valves are typically unidirectional in airflow and are employed in large wall structures where large amounts of airflow is required.

One form of blast valve, popularized by the book Nuclear War Survival Skills and tested by ORNL is worn flat rubber tire treads nailed or bolted to frames strong enough to resist the maximum overpressure, with tested closing times cited as being identical to commercial grade blast valves, however the use of this form of blast valve design must also take the risk of the flammable rubber catching fire into consideration.

== Gallery ==
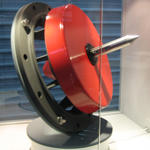
High pressure PSV Blast Valve protects to 60bar (~870psi) peak reflected overpressure.

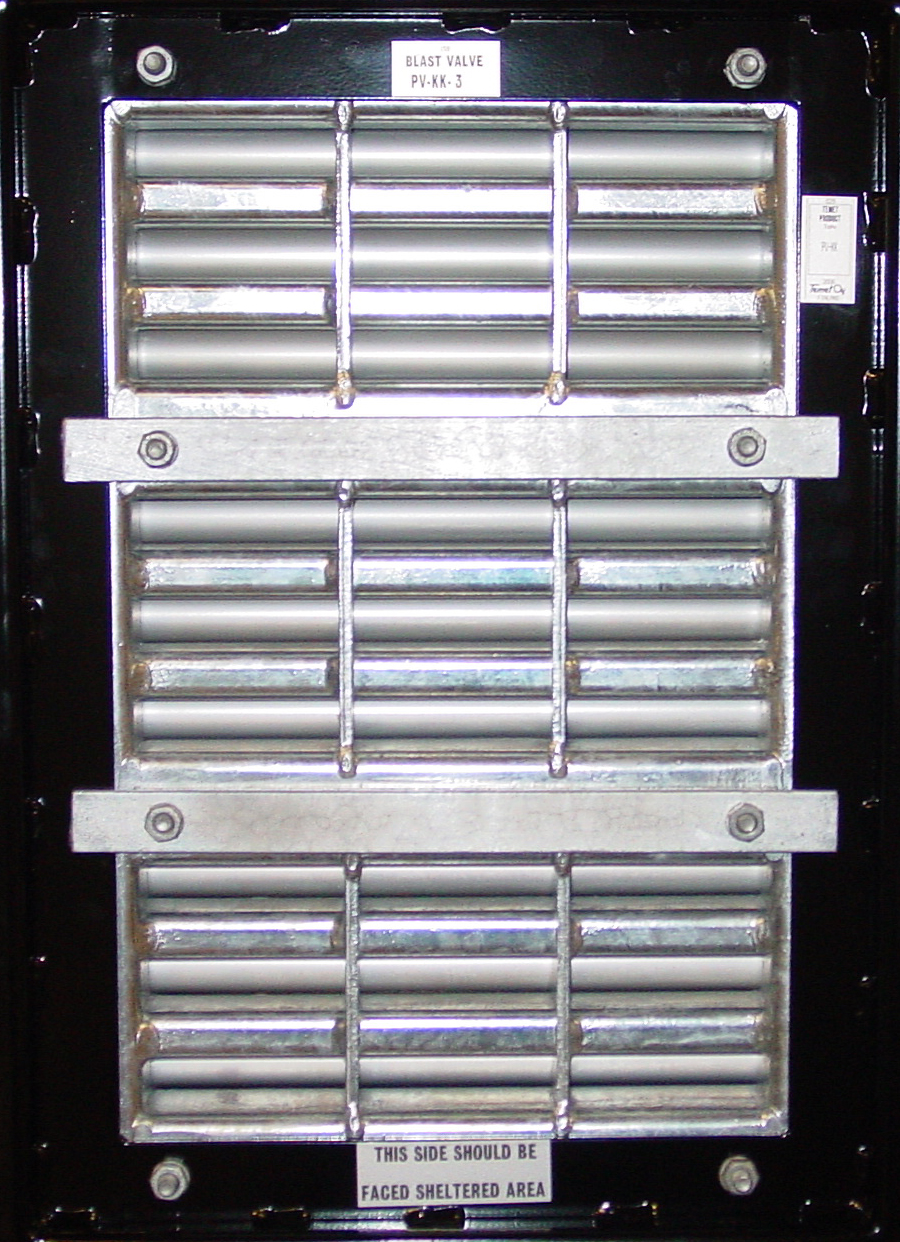
PV-KK Blast Valve used to protect against peak reflected overpressures up to 15bars (215psi).

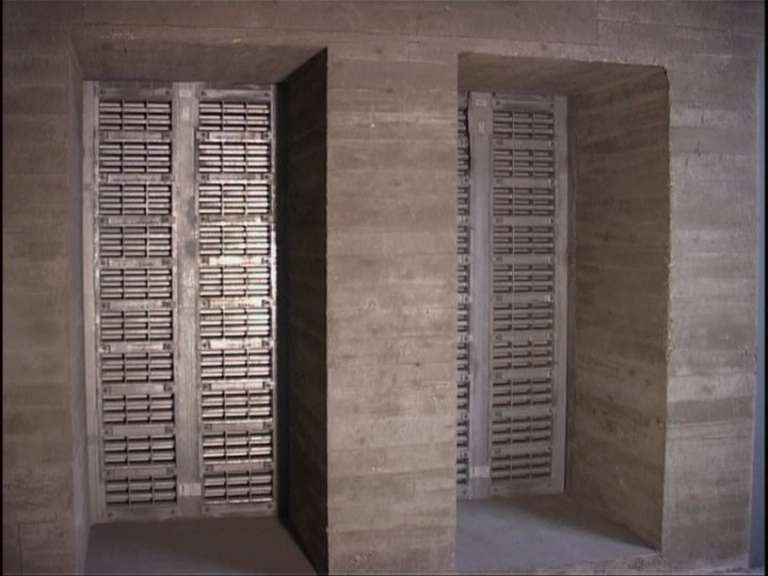
PV-KK Blast Valves embedded in massive concrete walls of a hardened shelter / bunker.

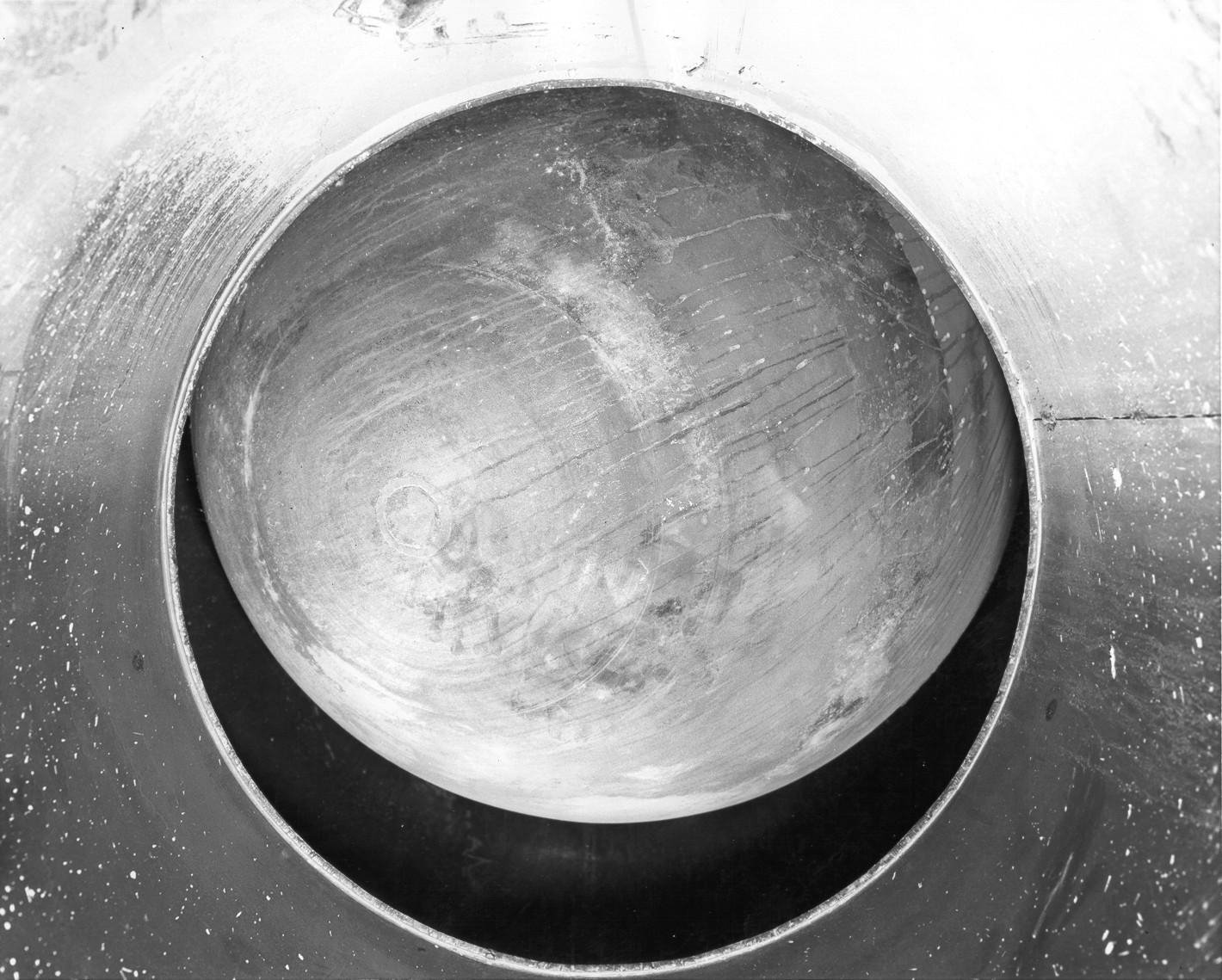
Hollow steel ball serving as a blast valve for the ventilating system of a hardened shelter.
