= Octamethylenediamine =

Octamethylendiamine
- Structural formula of octamethylenediamine

Names
- IUPAC name Octane-1,8-diamine
- Other names: 1,8-diaminooctane; 1,8-octanediamine; α,ω-Octanediamine; 4-(aminomethyl)octane-1,8-diamine

Identifiers
CAS Number	373-44-4
3D model (JSmol)	Interactive image
Abbreviations	OMDA
Beilstein Reference	3-04-00-00612
ChEBI	CHEBI:73112
ChEMBL	ChEMBL29392
ChemSpider	22672
DrugBank	DB04333
ECHA InfoCard	100.006.150
EC Number	206-764-3
PubChem CID	24250
RTECS number	RG8843000
UNII	53A6694PIE
CompTox Dashboard (EPA)	DTXSID9073173
- InChI: InChI=1S/C8H20N2/c9-7-5-3-1-2-4-6-8-10/h1-10H2 Key: PWGJDPKCLMLPJW-UHFFFAOYSA-N
- SMILES: NCCCCCCCCN

Properties
Chemical formula	C_{8}H_{20}N_{2}
Molar mass	144.26 g mol^{−1}
Appearance	colorless solid with an amine-like odor
Density	0.83 g cm^{−3} (60 °C)
Melting point	52 °C
Boiling point	225-226 °C
Solubility in water	Easily soluble in water (575 g l^{−1} at 20°C)
Vapor pressure	0.54 Pa (20 °C); 1.0 Pa (25°C); 32 Pa (50 °C)

Hazards
- GHS labelling
Pictograms	(GHS05: Corrosive) (GHS07: Exclamation mark)
Signal word	Danger
Hazard statements	H302, H314, H317
Precautionary statements	P260, P280, P301+P312+P330, P303+P361+P353, P305+P351+P338+P310
Flash point	113 °C
Safety data sheet (SDS)	"1,8-Diaminooctane". GESTIS-Stoffdatenbank.
- Except where otherwise noted, data are given for materials in their standard state (at 25 °C [77 °F], 100 kPa). Infobox references

Octamethylenediamine (OMDA) is an organic chemical compound from the substance group of aliphatic diamines. It is used as a versatile reaction intermediate in the manufacture of pesticides, especially fungicides.

== Manufacture ==
The industrial production of octamethylene diamine is carried out by the catalytic hydrogenation of suberonitrile at temperatures of 150 to 180 °C and a pressure of 50 to 180 bar in the presence of ammonia over heterogeneous cobalt unsupported catalysts:

Industrial synthesis of octamethylenediamine

The reaction is carried out in the liquid phase and is carried out continuously or batchwise. The catalyst is arranged as a fixed bed in a shaft, tube, or tube bundle reactor.

== Characteristics ==
Octamethylenediamine is a combustible but difficult to ignite. It is a solid that is easily soluble in water. The aqueous solutions are strongly alkaline (pH value of 12.1 at a concentration of 10 g/L).

== Use ==
Octamethylenediamine is used as a versatile intermediate in manufacturing pesticides, especially fungicides.

== Safety instructions ==
While octamethylenediamine is combustible, it is difficult to ignite because it is solid at moderate temperatures. It has a lower explosive limit (LEL) of 1.1 % by volume and an upper explosive limit (UEL) of 6.8 % by volume. The ignition temperature is 280 °C The substance therefore falls into temperature class T3. With a flash point of 113 °C, the liquid is considered difficult to ignite.
