= Bunker =

Defensive military storage fortification

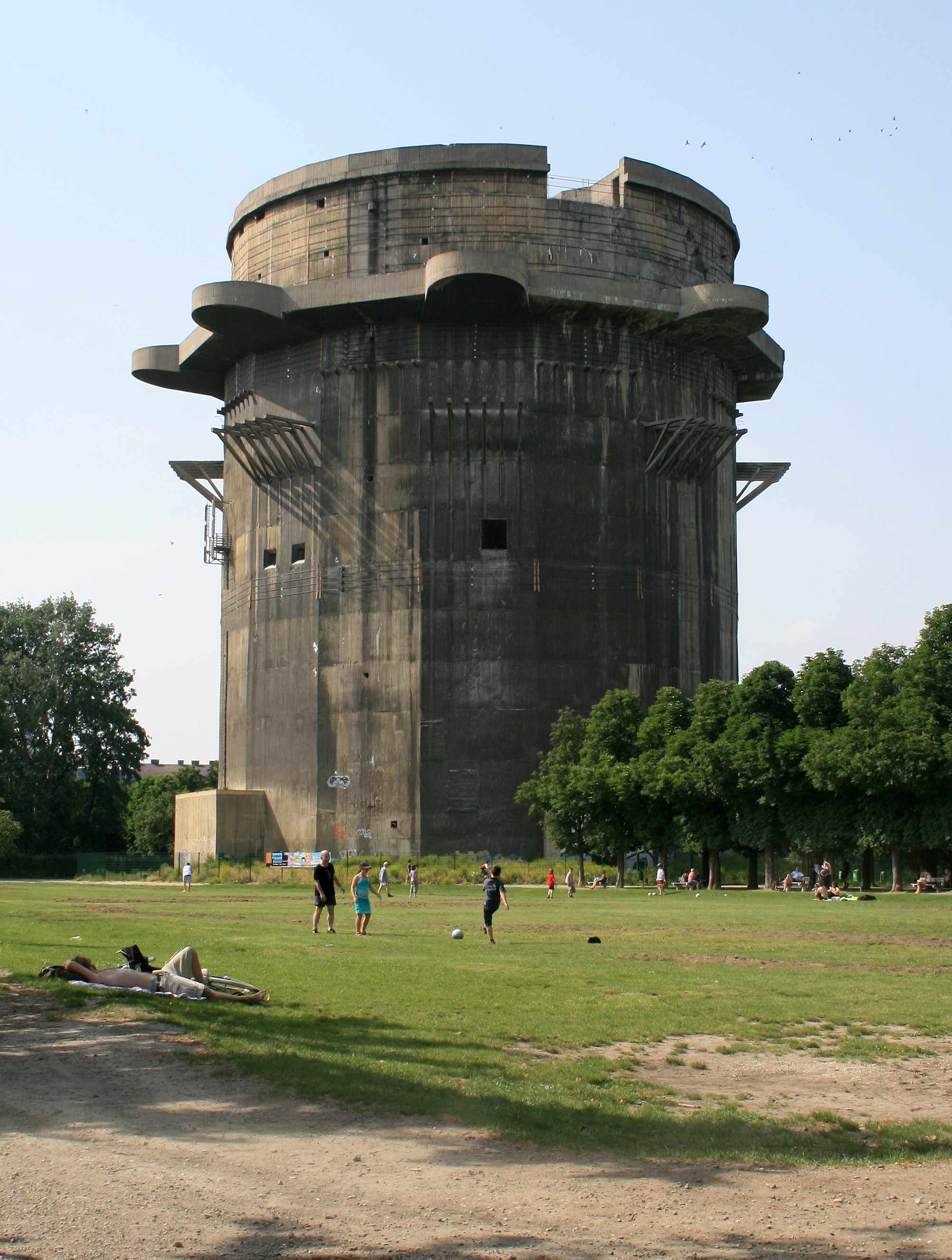
The Flakturm at the Augarten in Vienna. Flak towers were used as both above-ground bunkers and anti-aircraft gun blockhouses by Nazi Germany

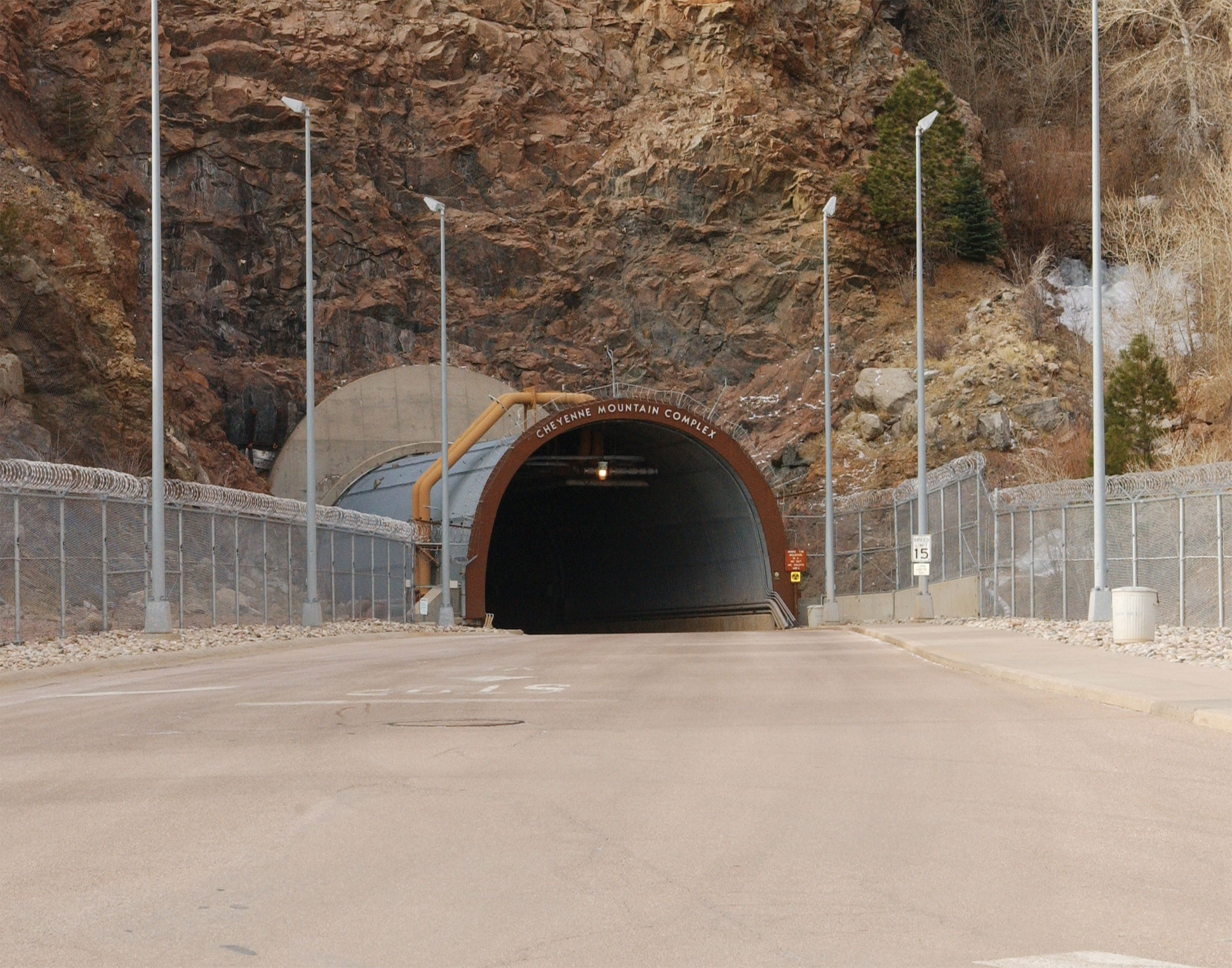
The north entrance to the Cheyenne Mountain Complex in Colorado, United States

A bunker is a defensive fortification designed to protect people and valued materials from falling bombs, artillery, or other attacks. Bunkers are almost always underground, in contrast to blockhouses which are mostly above ground. They were used extensively in World War I, World War II, and the Cold War for weapons facilities, command and control centers, storage facilities, etc. Bunkers can also be used as protection from tornadoes.

Trench bunkers are small concrete structures, partly dug into the ground. Many artillery installations, especially for coastal artillery, have historically been protected by extensive bunker systems. Typical industrial bunkers include mining sites, food storage areas, dumps for materials, data storage, and sometimes living quarters. When a house is purpose-built with a bunker, the normal location is a reinforced below-ground bathroom with fiber-reinforced plastic shells. Bunkers deflect the blast wave from nearby explosions to prevent ear and internal injuries to people sheltering in the bunker. Nuclear bunkers must also cope with the under pressure that lasts for several seconds after the shock wave passes, and block radiation.

A bunker's door must be at least as strong as the walls. In bunkers inhabited for prolonged periods, large amounts of ventilation or air conditioning must be provided. Bunkers can be destroyed with powerful explosives and bunker-busting warheads.

== Etymology ==
The word bunker originates as a Scots word for "bench, seat" recorded 1758, alongside shortened bunk "sleeping berth". The word possibly has a Scandinavian origin: Old Swedish bunke means "boards used to protect the cargo of a ship". In the 19th century the word came to describe a coal store in a house, or below decks in a ship. It was also used for a sand-filled depression installed on a golf course as a hazard.

In the First World War the belligerents built underground shelters, called dugouts in English, while the Germans used the term Bunker. By the Second World War the term came to be used by the Germans to describe permanent structures both large (blockhouses), and small (pillboxes), and bombproof shelters both above ground (as in Hochbunker) and below ground (such as the Führerbunker). The military sense of the word was imported into English during World War II, at first in reference to specifically German dug-outs; according to the Oxford English Dictionary, the sense of "military dug-out; a reinforced concrete shelter" is first recorded on 13 October 1939, in "A Nazi field gun hidden in a cemented 'bunker' on the Western front". All the early references to its usage in the Oxford English Dictionary are to German fortifications. However, in the Far East the term was also applied to the earth and log positions built by the Japanese, the term appearing in a 1943 instruction manual issued by the British Indian Army and quickly gaining wide currency.

By 1947, the word was familiar enough in English that Hugh Trevor-Roper in The Last Days of Hitler was describing Hitler's underground complex near the Reich Chancellery as "Hitler's own bunker" without quotes around the word bunker.

== Types ==
=== Trench ===
This type of bunker is a small concrete structure, partly dug into the ground, which is usually a part of a trench system. Such bunkers give the defending soldiers better protection than the open trench and also include top protection against aerial attack. They also provide shelter against the weather. Some bunkers may have partially open tops to allow weapons to be discharged with the muzzle pointing upwards (e.g., mortars and anti-aircraft weapons).

=== Artillery ===
Many artillery installations, especially for coastal artillery, have historically been protected by extensive bunker systems. These usually housed the crews serving the weapons, protected the ammunition against counter-battery fire, and in numerous examples also protected the guns themselves, though this was usually a trade-off reducing their fields of fire. Artillery bunkers are some of the largest individual pre-Cold War bunkers. The walls of the 'Batterie Todt' gun installation in northern France were up to 3.5 metres (11 ft) thick, and an underground bunker was constructed for the V-3 cannon.

=== Industrial ===
Typical industrial bunkers include mining sites, food storage areas, dumps for materials, data storage, and sometimes living quarters. They were built mainly by nations like Germany during World War II to protect important industries from aerial bombardment. Industrial bunkers are also built for control rooms of dangerous activities, such as tests of rocket engines or explosive experiments. They are also built in order to perform dangerous experiments in them or to store radioactive or explosive goods. Such bunkers also exist on non-military facilities.

=== Personal ===
When a house is purpose-built with a bunker, the normal location is a reinforced below-ground bathroom with large cabinets. One common design approach uses fibre-reinforced plastic shells. Compressive protection may be provided by inexpensive earth arching. The overburden is designed to shield from radiation. To prevent the shelter from floating to the surface in high groundwater, some designs have a skirt held down with the overburden. It may also serve the purpose of a safe room.

Large bunkers are often bought by super rich individuals in case of political instability, and usually store or access large amounts of energy for use. They are sometimes referred to as "luxury bunkers," and their locations are often documented.

=== Munitions storage ===
Munitions storage bunkers are designed to securely store explosive ordnance and contain any internal explosions. The most common configuration for high explosives storage is the igloo shaped bunker. They are often built into a hillside in order to provide additional containment mass.

A specialized version of the munitions bunker called a Gravel Gertie is designed to contain radioactive debris from an explosive accident while assembling or disassembling nuclear warheads. They are installed at all facilities in the United States and United Kingdom which do warhead assembly and disassembly, the largest being the Pantex plant in Amarillo, Texas, which has 12 Gravel Gerties.

== Design ==
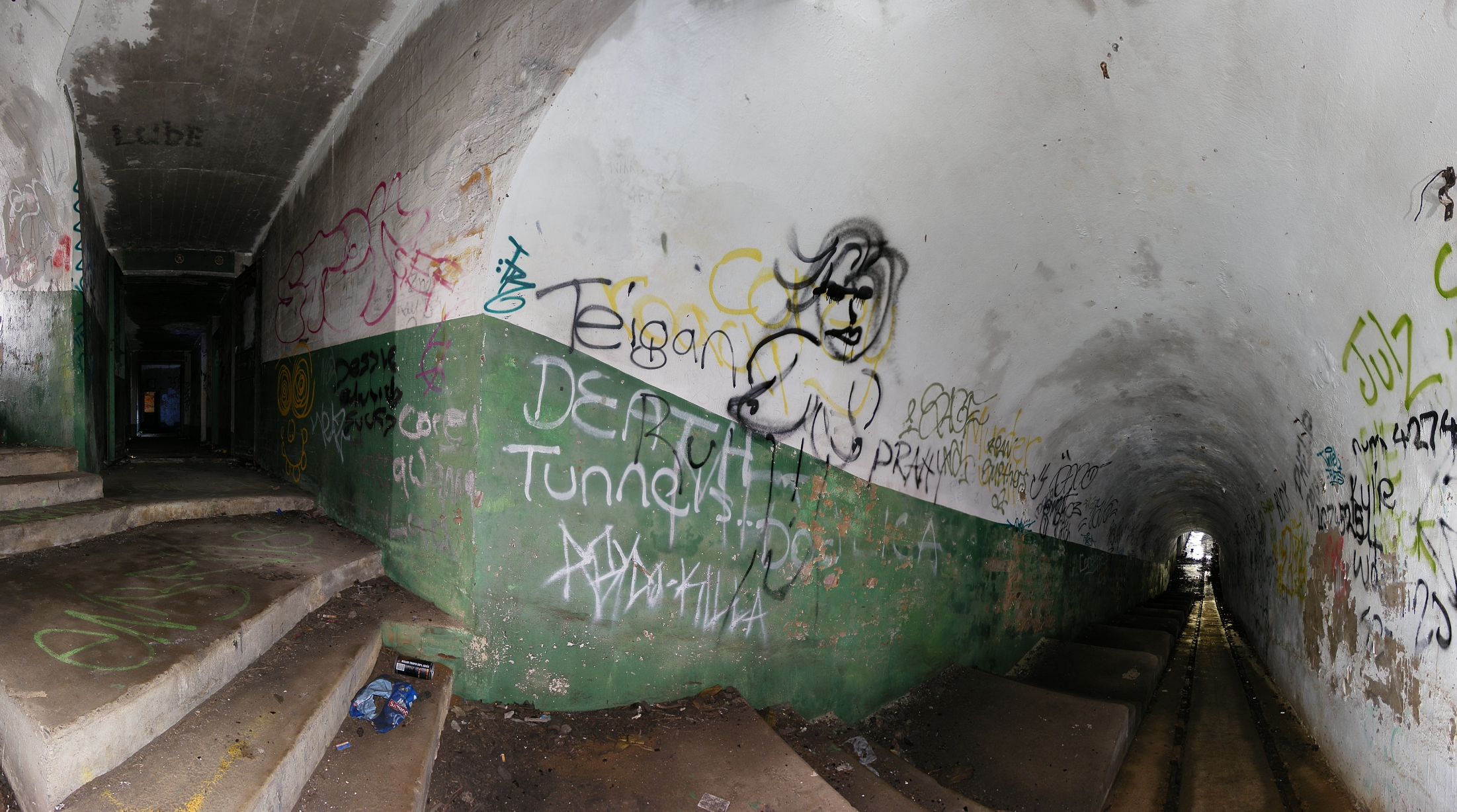
Inside the Hill 60 Bunker, Port Kembla, New South Wales, Australia. One of many bunkers south of Sydney

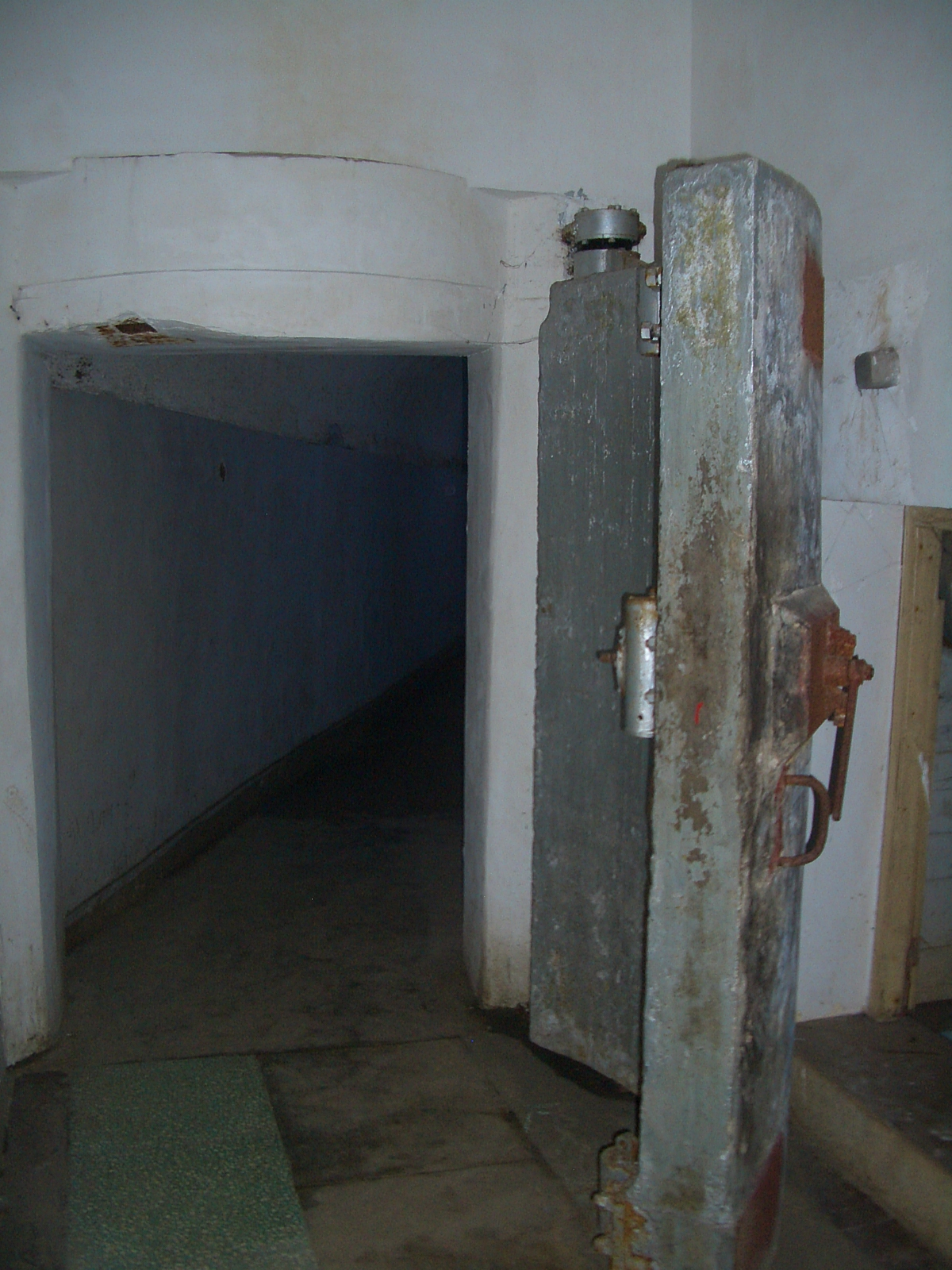
In a Project 131 tunnel under the hills of Hubei

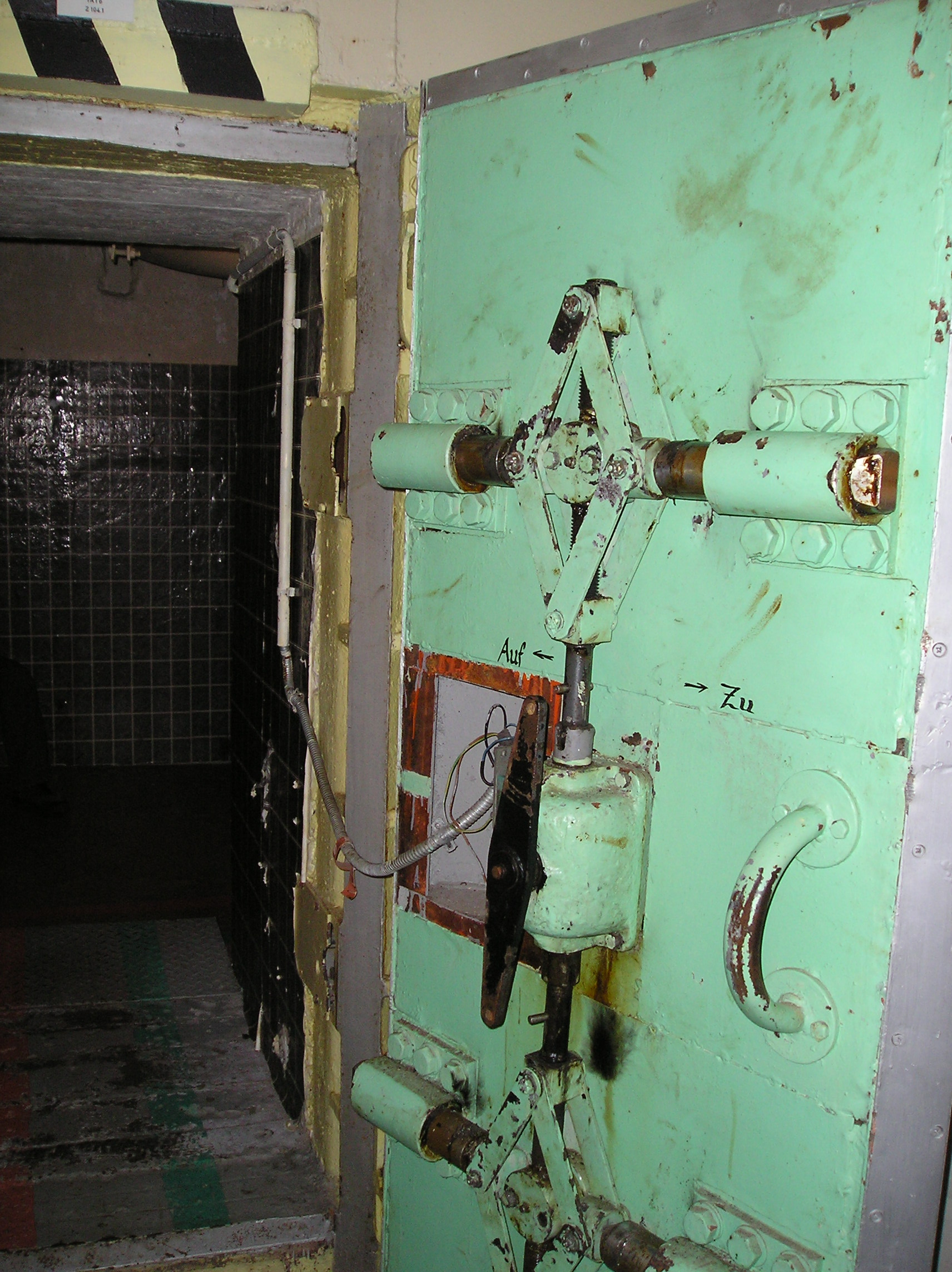
Object 17/5001 Prenden, Germany

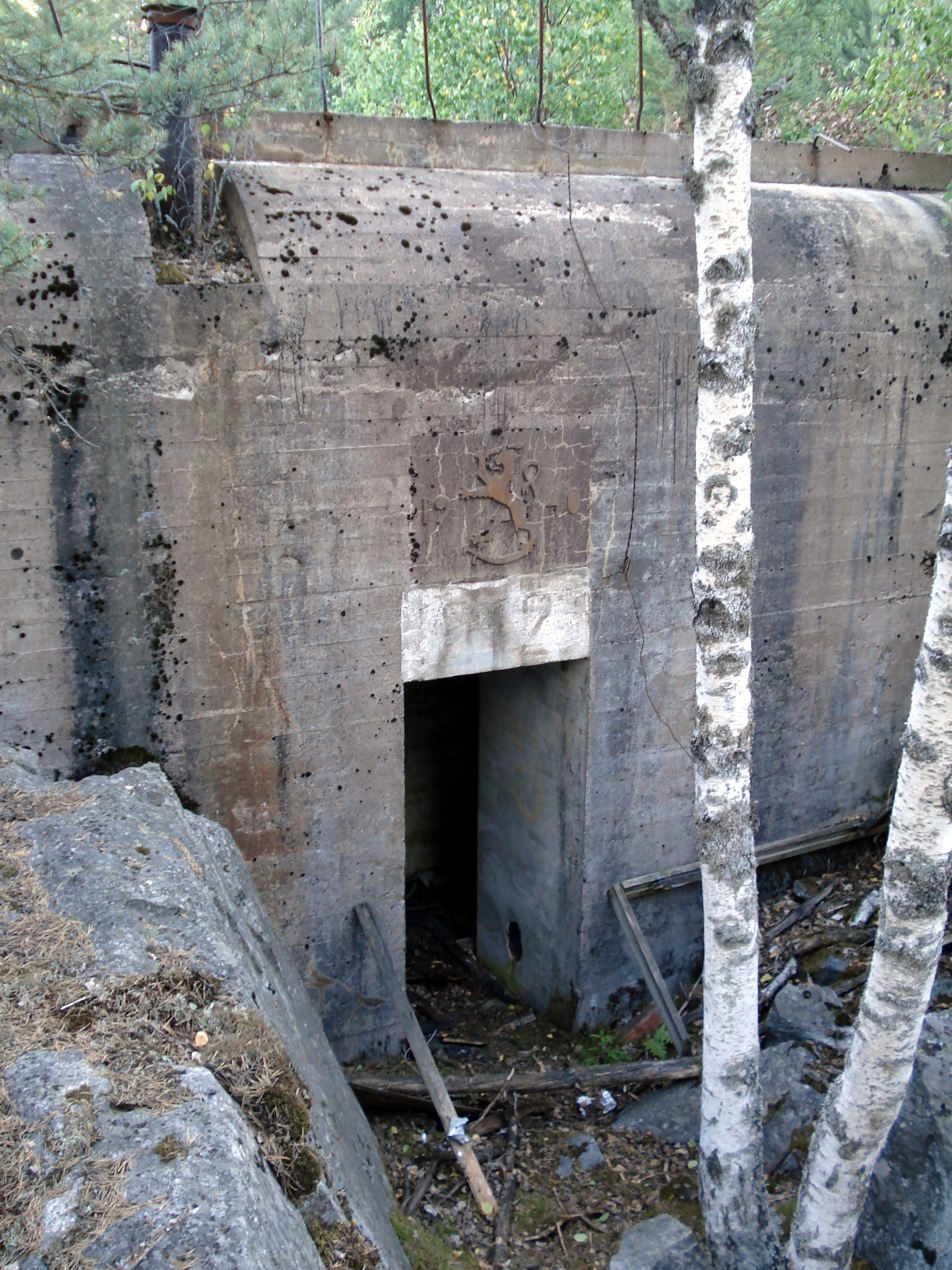
Bunker of the Harparskog Line in Raseborg, Finland

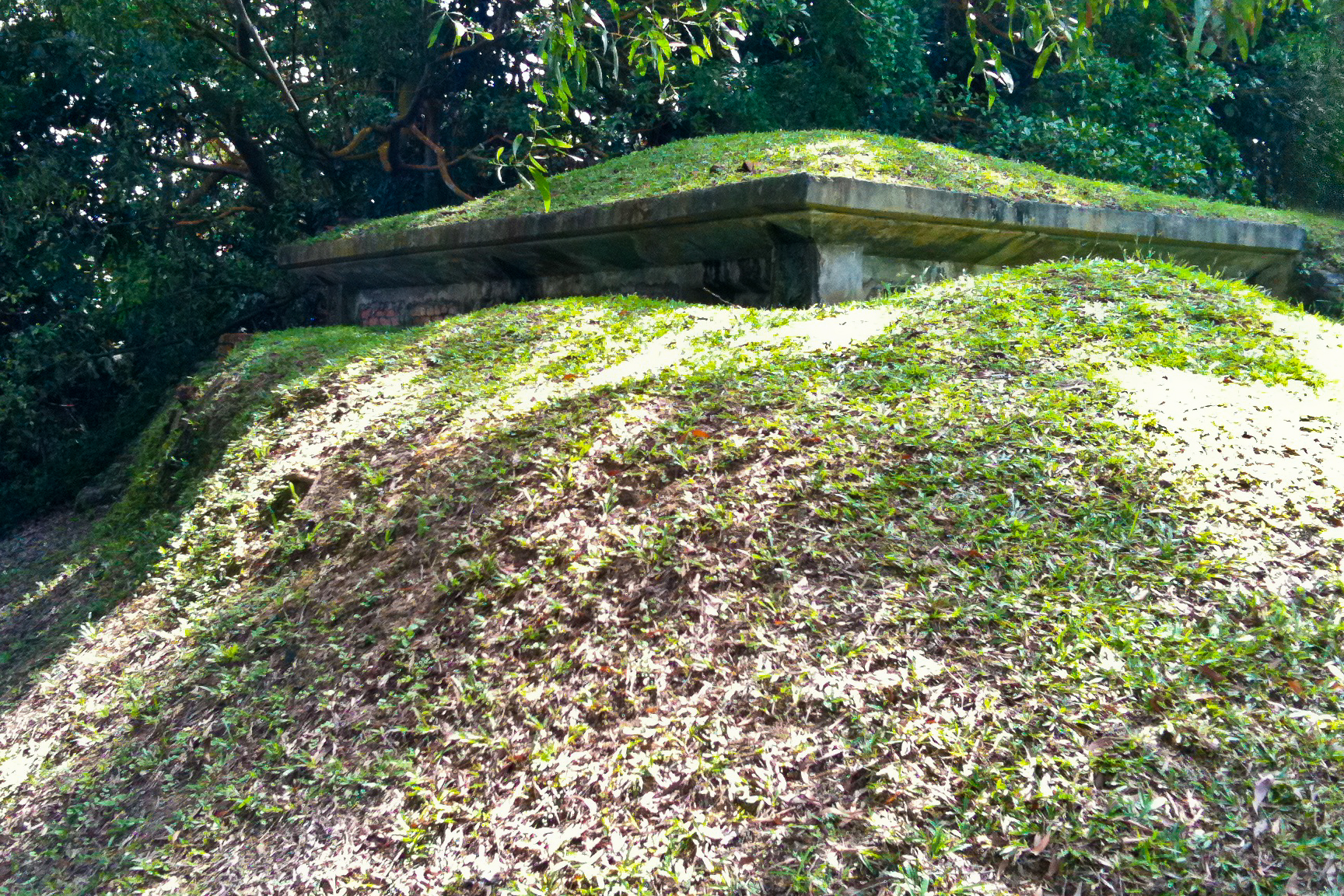
Bunker in Singapore

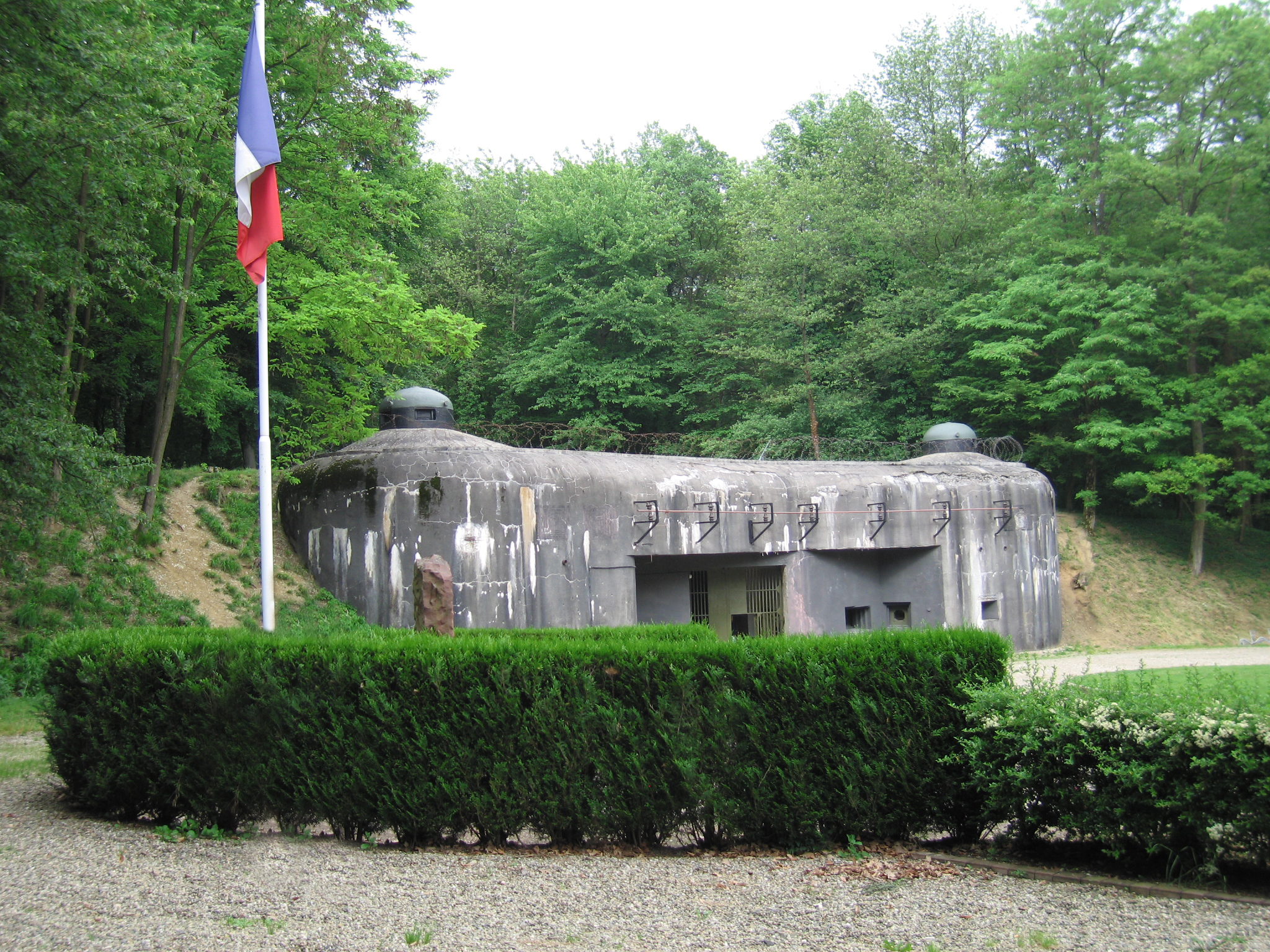
The entrance to Ouvrage Schoenenbourg along the Maginot Line in France.

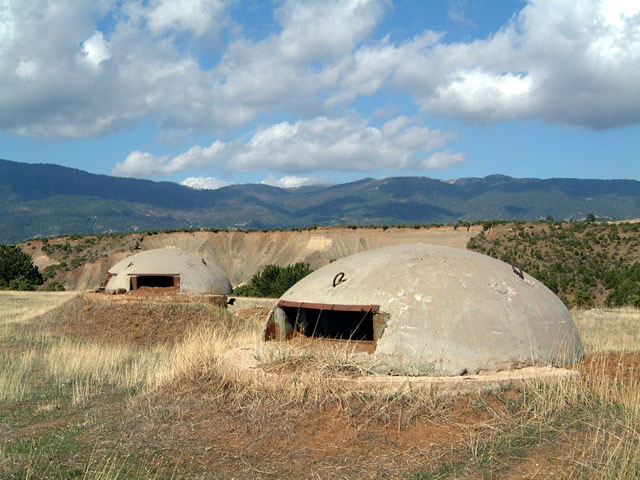
Bunkers in Albania

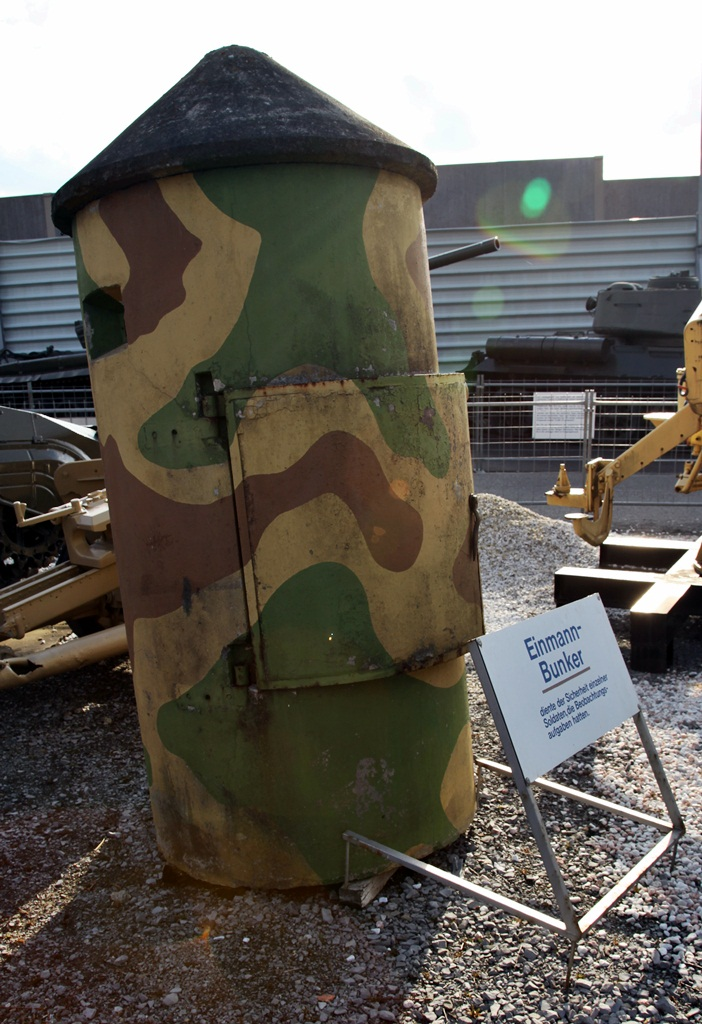
German single person bunker for reconnaissance personnel in the field

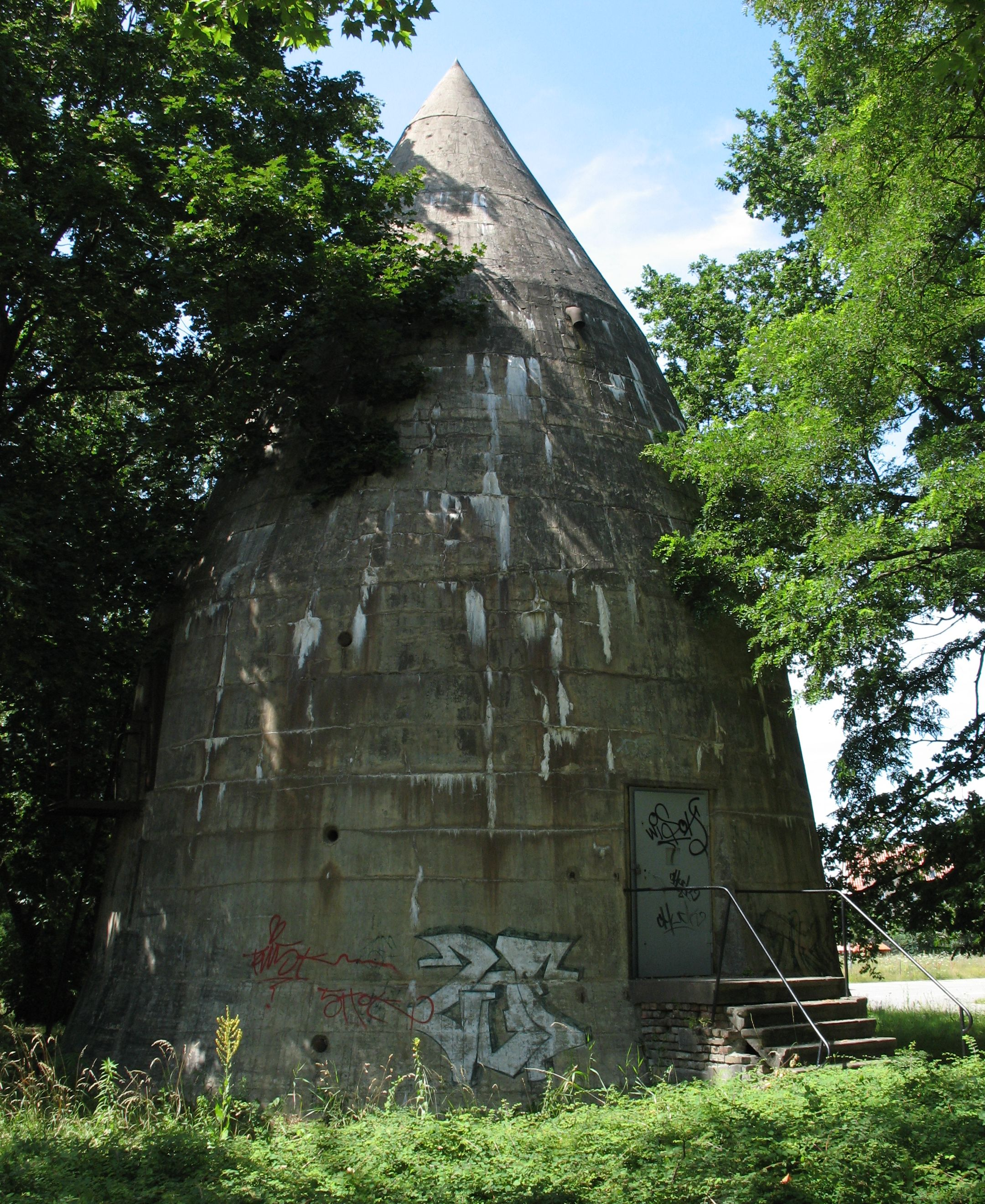
Bunker of type Winkel in Brandenburg an der Havel

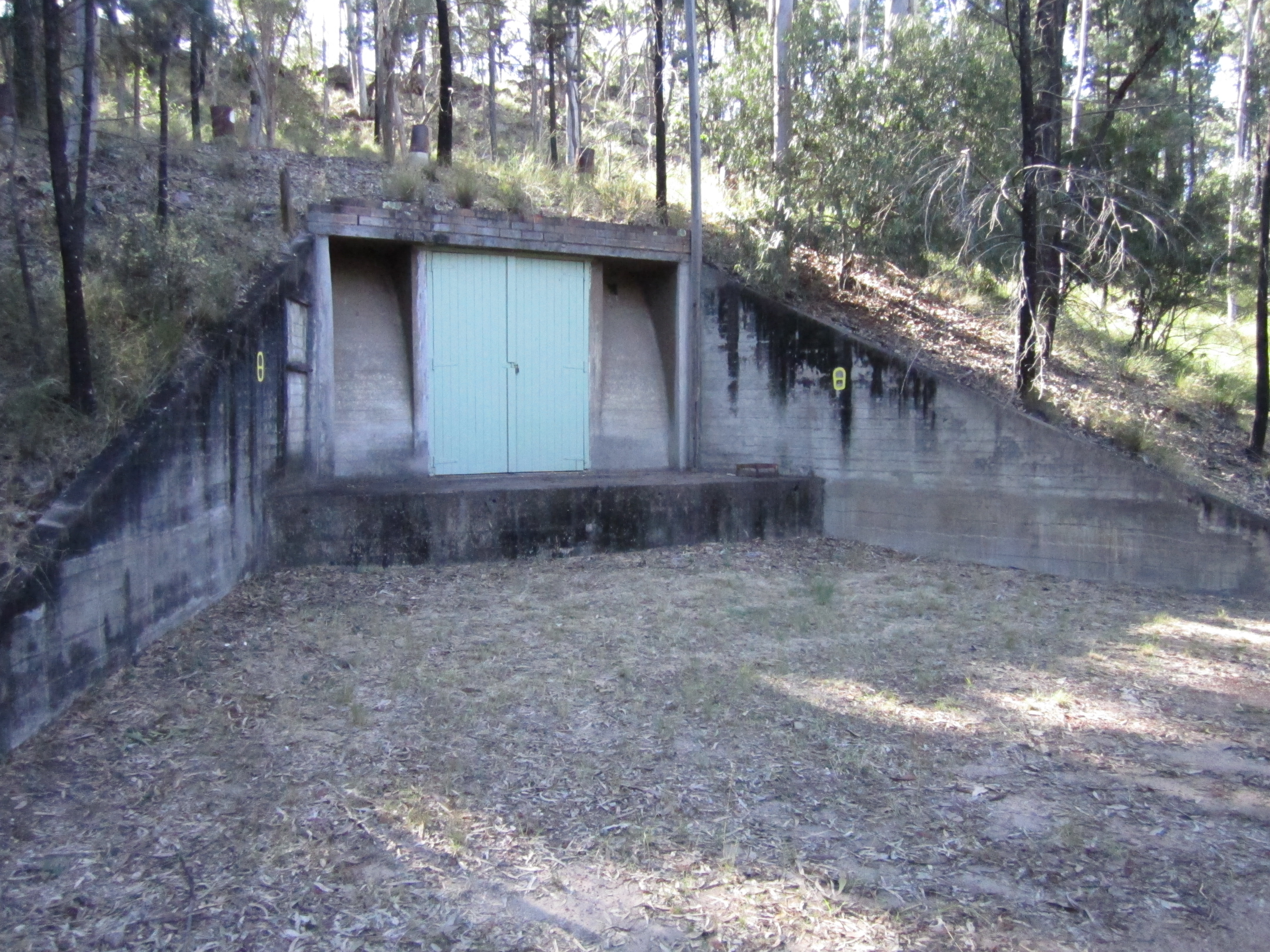
Munitions bunker at Possum Park, Queensland, Australia.

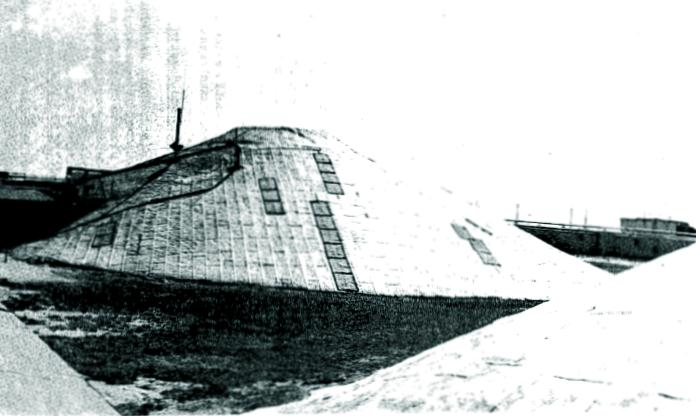
Gravel Gertie at the Pantex nuclear weapons plant, Amarillo, Texas.

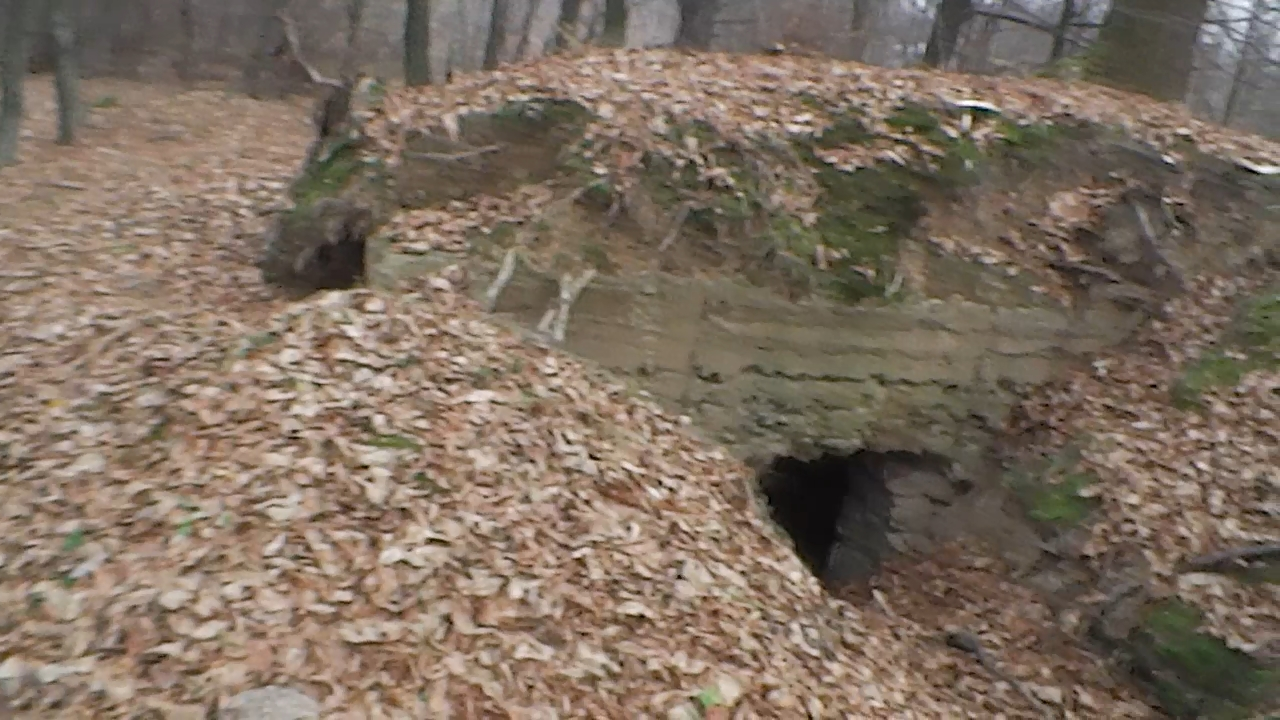
Austrian bunker from World War I in West Ukraine

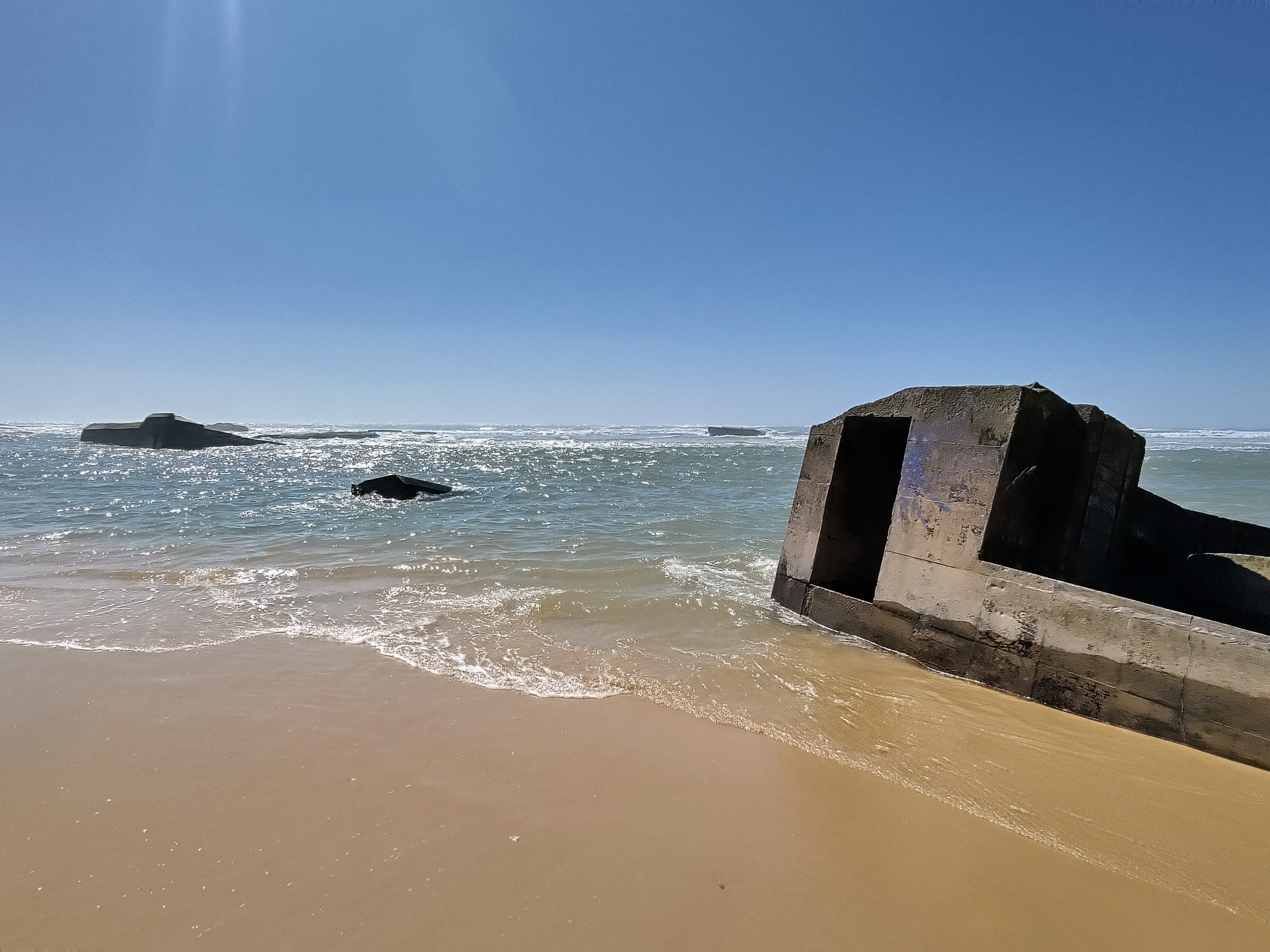
Ruins of Nazi bunkers at Cap Ferret, France

=== Blast protection ===
Bunkers deflect the blast wave from nearby explosions to prevent ear and internal injuries to people sheltering in the bunker. While frame buildings collapse from as little as 21 kPa (3 psi; 0.21 bar) of overpressure, bunkers are regularly constructed to survive over 1,000 kPa (150 psi; 10 bar). This substantially decreases the likelihood that a bomb (other than a bunker buster) can harm the structure.

The basic plan is to provide a structure that is very strong in physical compression. The most common purpose-built structure is a buried, steel reinforced concrete vault or arch. Most expedient blast shelters are civil engineering structures that contain large, buried tubes or pipes such as sewage or rapid transit tunnels. Improvised purpose-built blast shelters normally use earthen arches or vaults. To form these, a narrow, 1–2-metre (3.5–6.5 ft), flexible tent of thin wood is placed in a deep trench, and then covered with cloth or plastic, and then covered with 1–2 m (3.5–6.5 feet) of tamped earth.

A large ground shock can move the walls of a bunker several centimeters in a few milliseconds. Bunkers designed for large ground shocks must have sprung internal buildings to protect inhabitants from the walls and floors.

=== Nuclear protection ===
Nuclear bunkers must also cope with the underpressure that lasts for several seconds after the shock wave passes, and block radiation. Usually, these features are easy to provide. The overburden (soil) and structure provide substantial radiation shielding, and the negative pressure is usually only 1/3 of the overpressure.

=== General features ===
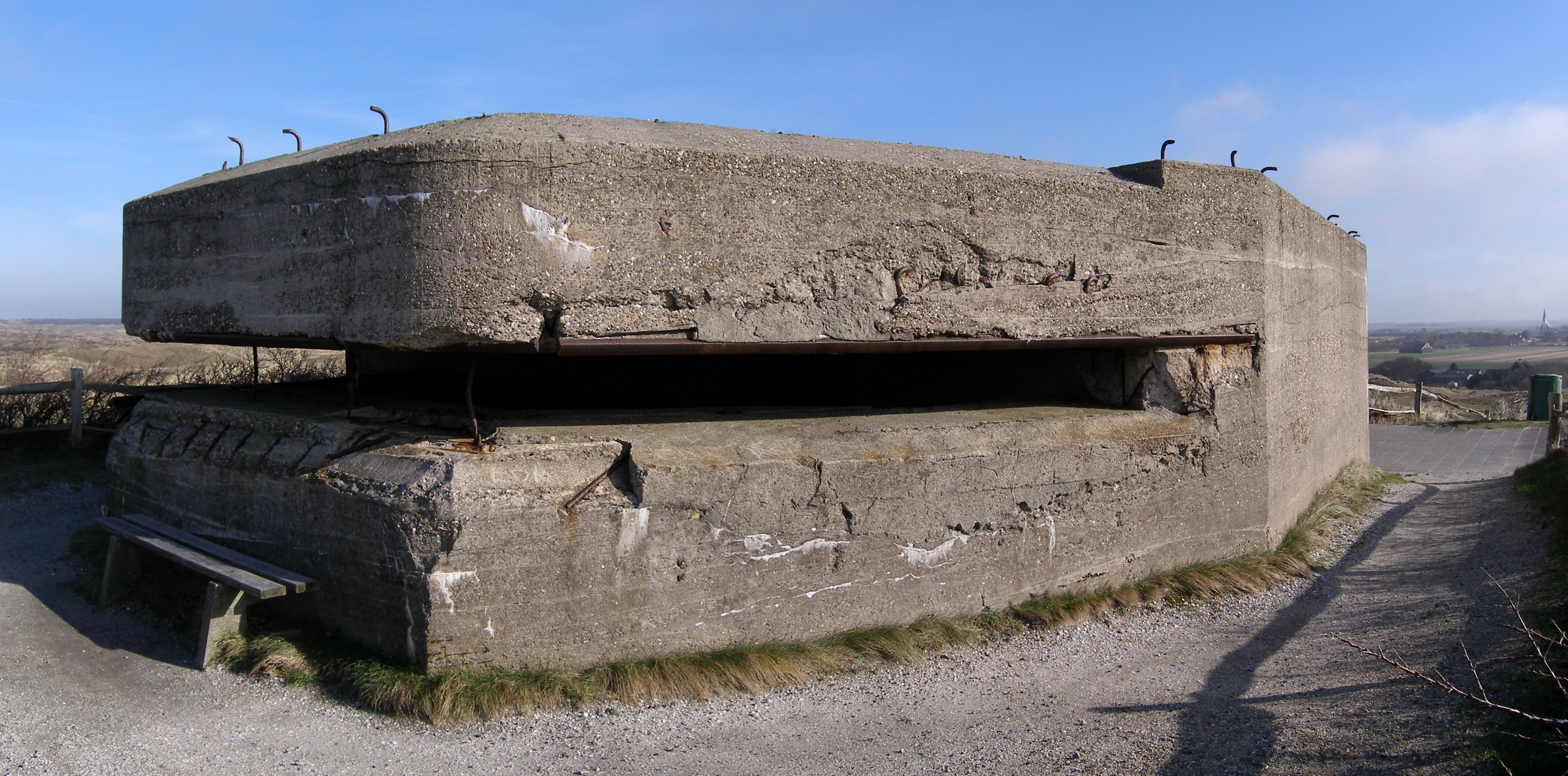
A bunker on the island of Texel, in the Netherlands.

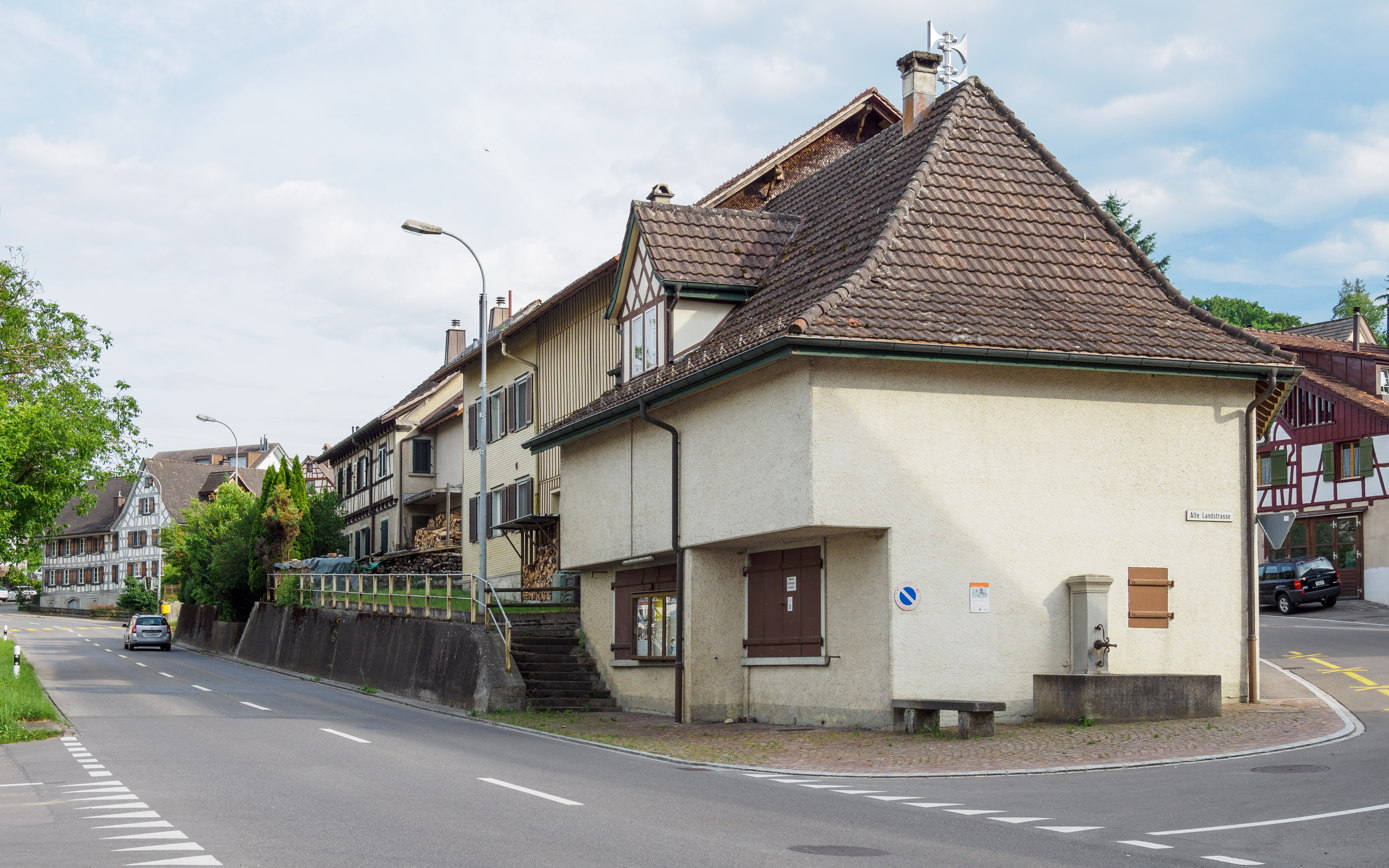
Triboltingen (Switzerland), on the corner: anti-tank bunker, disguised as a house, built in 1938

The doors must be at least as strong as the walls. The usual design is now starting to incorporate vault doors. To reduce the weight, the door is normally constructed of steel, with a fitted steel lintel and frame. Very thick wood also serves and is more resistant to heat because it chars rather than melts. If the door is on the surface and will be exposed to the blast wave, the edge of the door is normally counter-sunk in the frame so that the blast wave or a reflection cannot lift the edge. A bunker should have two doors. Door shafts may double as ventilation shafts to reduce digging.

In bunkers inhabited for prolonged periods, large amounts of ventilation or air conditioning must be provided in order to prevent ill effects of heat. In bunkers designed for war-time use, manually operated ventilators must be provided because supplies of electricity or gas are unreliable. One of the most efficient manual ventilator designs is the Kearny Air Pump. Ventilation openings in a bunker must be protected by blast valves. A blast valve is closed by a shock wave, but otherwise remains open. One form of expedient blast valve is worn flat rubber tire treads nailed or bolted to frames strong enough to resist the maximum overpressure.

== Countermeasures ==
Bunkers can be destroyed with powerful explosives and bunker busting warheads. The crew of a pillbox can be killed with flamethrowers. As well as that, even if a explosive device doesn't manage to penetrate the bunker, they might be able to cause internal spalling, splash, and damage the structure. Blasts also can cause concussion, or unconsciousness in defenders. Complex, well-built and well-protected fortifications are often vulnerable to attacks on access points. If the exits to the surface can be closed off, those manning the facility can be trapped. The fortification can then be bypassed.

== Famous installations ==
Famous bunkers include the post-World War I Maginot Line on the French eastern border and Czechoslovak border fortifications mainly on the northern Czech border facing Germany (but to lesser extent all around), Fort Eben-Emael in Belgium, Alpine Wall on the north of Italy, World War II Führerbunker and in Italy, industrial Marnate's Bunker, the V-weapon installations in Germany (Mittelwerk) and France (La Coupole, and the Blockhaus d'Éperlecques) and the Cold War installations in the United States (Cheyenne Mountain Complex, Site R, and The Greenbrier), United Kingdom (Burlington), Sweden (Boden Fortress) and Canada (Diefenbunker). In Switzerland, there is an unusually large number of bunkers because of a law requiring protective shelters to be constructed for all new buildings since 1963, as well as a number of bunkers built as part of its National Redoubt military defense plan. Some of Switzerland's bunkers have since become tourist attractions housing hotels and museums such as Sasso San Gottardo Museum.

The Soviet Union maintained huge bunkers (one of the secondary uses of the very deeply dug Moscow Metro and Kyiv metro systems was as nuclear shelters). A number of facilities were constructed in China, such as Beijing's Underground City and Underground Project 131 in Hubei; in Albania, Enver Hoxha dotted the country with hundreds of thousands of bunkers. In the United States, since the 1940s, the Presidential Emergency Operations Center (PEOC) underneath the East Wing of the White House served as a secure shelter & communications center for the President of the United States in case of an emergency. It was torn down in 2025 during the second Trump administration to make way for the White House State Ballroom & military complex.

== See also ==
- Tunnel warfare
- Air raid shelter
- Bomb shelter
- Underground hangar
- Submarine pen
- Fallout shelter
- Pillbox (military)
- Regelbau
- Continuity of government
- Civil Defense
- Paramilitary
