= Relief valve =

Safety valve used to control or limit the pressure in a system

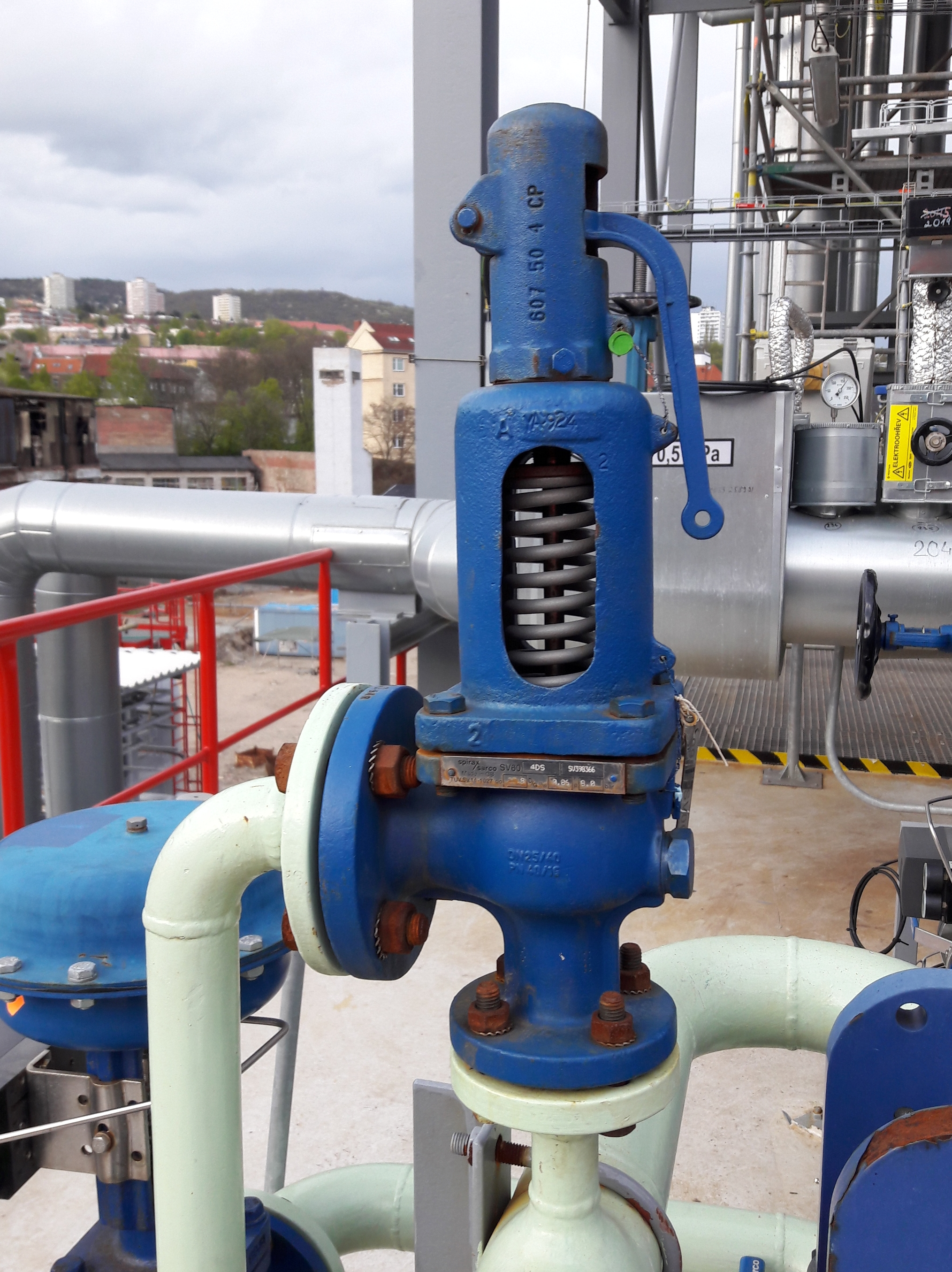
A relief valve DN25 on cooling water pipe from heat exchanger

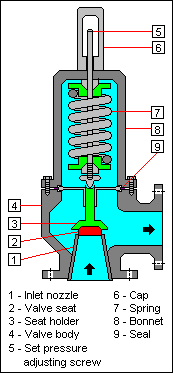
Schematic diagram of a conventional spring-loaded pressure relief valve

A relief valve or pressure relief valve (PRV) is a type of safety valve used to control or limit the pressure in a system; excessive pressure might otherwise build up and create a process upset, instrument or equipment failure, explosion, or fire.

== Pressure relief ==
Excess pressure is relieved by allowing the pressurized fluid to flow from an auxiliary passage out of the system. The relief valve is designed or set to open at a predetermined set pressure to protect pressure vessels and other equipment from being subjected to pressures that exceed their design limits. When the set pressure is exceeded, the relief valve becomes the "path of least resistance" as the valve is forced open and a portion of the fluid is diverted through the auxiliary route.

In systems containing flammable fluids, the diverted fluid (liquid, gas or liquid-gas mixture) is either recaptured by a low pressure, high-flow vapor recovery system or is routed through a piping system known as a flare header or relief header to a central, elevated gas flare where it is burned, releasing naked combustion gases into the atmosphere. In non-hazardous systems, the fluid is often discharged to the atmosphere by a suitable discharge pipework designed to prevent rainwater ingress which can affect the set lift pressure, and positioned not to cause a hazard to personnel.

As the fluid is diverted, the pressure inside the vessel will stop rising. Once it reaches the valve's reseating pressure, the valve will close. The blowdown is usually stated as a percentage of set pressure and refers to how much the pressure needs to drop before the valve reseats. The blowdown can vary roughly 2–20%, and some valves have adjustable blowdowns.

In high-pressure gas systems, it is recommended that the outlet of the relief valve be in the open air. In systems where the outlet is connected to piping, the opening of a relief valve will give a pressure build-up in the piping system downstream of the relief valve. This often means that the relief valve will not re-seat once the set pressure is reached. For these systems often so-called "differential" relief valves are used. This means that the pressure is only working on an area that is much smaller than the area of the opening of the valve. If the valve is opened, the pressure has to decrease enormously before the valve closes and also the outlet pressure of the valve can easily keep the valve open. Another consideration is that if other relief valves are connected to the outlet pipe system, they may open as the pressure in the exhaust pipe system increases. This may cause undesired operation.

In some cases, a so-called bypass valve acts as a relief valve by being used to return all or part of the fluid discharged by a pump or gas compressor back to either a storage reservoir or the inlet of the pump or gas compressor. This is done to protect the pump or gas compressor and any associated equipment from excessive pressure. The bypass valve and bypass path can be internal (an integral part of the pump or compressor) or external (installed as a component in the fluid path). Many fire engines have such relief valves to prevent the overpressurization of fire hoses.

In other cases, equipment must be protected against being subjected to an internal vacuum (i.e., low pressure) that is lower than the equipment can withstand. In such cases, vacuum relief valves are used to open at a predetermined low-pressure limit and to admit air or an inert gas into the equipment to control the amount of vacuum.

== Technical terms ==
In the petroleum refining, petrochemical and chemical manufacturing, natural gas processing and power generation industries, the term relief valve is associated with the terms pressure relief valve (PRV), pressure safety valve (PSV) and safety valve:

- Pressure relief valve (PRV) or Pressure Release valve (PRV) or pressure safety valve (PSV): The difference is that PSVs have a manual lever to activate the valve in case of emergency. Most PRVs are spring operated. At lower pressures some use a diaphragm in place of a spring. The oldest PRV designs use a weight to seal the valve.
- Set pressure: When the system pressure increases to this value, the PRV opens. The accuracy of the set pressure may follow guidelines set by the American Society of Mechanical Engineers (ASME).
- Relief valve (RV): A valve is used on a liquid service, which opens proportionally as the increasing pressure overcomes the spring pressure.
- Safety valve (SV): Used in gas service. Most SVs are full lift or snap-acting, in that they pop completely open.
- Safety relief valve (SRV): A relief valve that can be used for gas or liquid service. However, the set pressure will usually only be accurate for one type of fluid at a time.
- Pilot-operated relief valve (POSRV, PORV, POPRV): A device that relieves by remote command from a pilot valve which is connected to the upstream system pressure.
- Low-pressure safety valve (LPSV): An automatic system that relieves by the static pressure of a gas. The relieving pressure is small and near the atmospheric pressure.
- Vacuum pressure safety valve (VPSV): An automatic system that relieves by the static pressure of a gas. The relieving pressure is small, negative, and near the atmospheric pressure.
- Low and vacuum pressure safety valve (LVPSV): An automatic system that relieves by the static pressure of a gas. The relieving pressure is small, negative, or positive, and near the atmospheric pressure.
- Pressure vacuum release valve (PVRV): A combination of vacuum pressure and a relief valve in one housing. Used on storage tanks for liquids to prevent implosion or overpressure.
- Snap acting: The opposite of modulating, refers to a valve that "pops" open. It snaps into a full lift in milliseconds. Usually accomplished with a skirt on the disc so that the fluid passing the seat suddenly affects a larger area and creates more lifting force.
- Modulating: Opens in proportion to the overpressure.

== Legal and code requirements in industry ==
In most countries, industries are legally required to protect pressure vessels and other equipment by using relief valves. Also in most countries, equipment design codes such as those provided by the American Society of Mechanical Engineers (ASME), American Petroleum Institute (API) and other organizations like ISO (ISO 4126) must be complied with and those codes include design standards for relief valves.

The main standards, laws, or directives are:

- AD Merkblatt (German)
- American Petroleum Institute (API); Standards 520, 521, 526, and 2000
- American Society of Mechanical Engineers (ASME); Boiler & Pressure Vessel Code, Section VIII Division 1 and Section I
- American Water Works Association (AWWA), storage tanks
- EN 764-7; European Standard based on pressure Equipment Directive 97/23/EC
- Eurocode EN 1993-4-2, storage tanks.
- International Organization for Standardization; ISO 4126
- Pressure Systems Safety Regulations 2000 (PSSR); UK

== Design Institute for Emergency Relief Systems (DIERS) ==
Formed in 1977, the Design Institute for Emergency Relief Systems was a consortium of 29 companies under the auspices of the American Institute of Chemical Engineers (AIChE) that developed methods for the design of emergency relief systems to handle runaway reactions. Its purpose was to develop the technology and methods needed for sizing pressure relief systems for chemical reactors, particularly those in which exothermic reactions are carried out. Such reactions include many classes of industrially important processes including polymerizations, nitrations, diazotizations, sulphonations, epoxidations, aminations, esterifications, neutralizations, and many others. Pressure relief systems can be difficult to design, not least because what is expelled can be gas/vapor, liquid, or a mixture of the two – just as with a can of carbonated drink when it is suddenly opened. For chemical reactions, it requires extensive knowledge of both chemical reaction hazards and fluid flow.

DIERS has investigated the two-phase vapor-liquid onset/disengagement dynamics and the hydrodynamics of emergency relief systems with extensive experimental and analysis work. Of particular interest to DIERS were the prediction of two-phase flow venting and the applicability of various sizing methods for two-phase vapor-liquid flashing flow. DIERS became a user's group in 1985.

European DIERS Users' Group (EDUG) is a group of mainly European industrialists, consultants and academics who use the DIERS technology. The EDUG started in the late 1980s and has an annual meeting. A summary of many of key aspects of the DIERS technology has been published in the UK by the HSE.

== See also ==
- Blowoff valve
- Rupture disc
- Safety valve
- Surge control
