= Rupture disc =

Non-closing over-pressure relief device

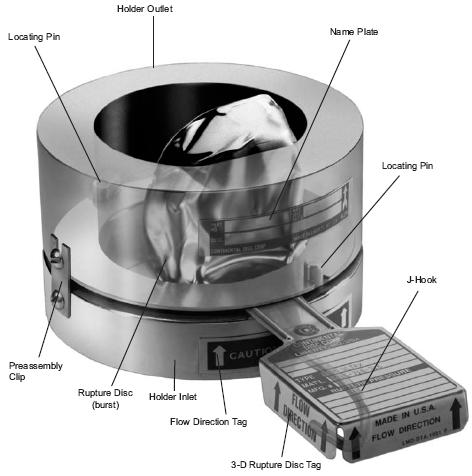
A rupture disc (burst)

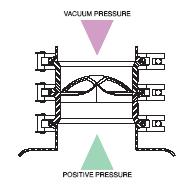
Pressure-effect acting at a rupture disc

A rupture disc, also known as a pressure safety disc, burst disc, bursting disc, or burst diaphragm, is a non-reclosing pressure relief safety device that, in most uses, protects a pressure vessel, equipment or system from overpressurization or potentially damaging vacuum conditions.

A rupture disc is a type of sacrificial part because it has a one-time-use membrane that fails at a predetermined differential pressure, either positive or vacuum and at a coincident temperature. The membrane is usually made out of metal, but nearly any material (or different materials in layers) can be used to suit a particular application. Rupture discs provide instant response (within milliseconds or microseconds in very small sizes) to an increase or decrease in system pressure, but once the disc has ruptured it will not reseal. Major advantages of the application of rupture discs compared to using pressure relief valves include leak-tightness, cost, response time, size constraints, flow area, and ease of maintenance.

Rupture discs are commonly used in petrochemical, aerospace, aviation, defense, medical, railroad, nuclear, chemical, pharmaceutical, food processing and oil field applications. They can be used as single protection devices or as a secondary relief device for a conventional safety valve; if the pressure increases and the safety valve fails to operate or can not relieve enough pressure fast enough, the rupture disc will burst. Rupture discs are very often used in combination with safety relief valves, isolating the valves from the process, thereby saving on valve maintenance and creating a leak-tight pressure relief solution. It is sometimes possible and preferable for highest reliability, though at higher initial cost, to avoid the use of emergency pressure relief devices by developing an intrinsically safe mechanical design that provides containment in all cases.

Although commonly manufactured in disc form, the devices also are manufactured as rectangular panels ('rupture panels', 'vent panels' or explosion vents) and used to protect buildings, enclosed conveyor systems or any very large space from overpressurization typically due to an explosion. Rupture disc sizes range from 0.125 in (3 mm) to over 4 ft (1.2 m), depending upon the industry application. Rupture discs and vent panels are constructed from carbon steel, stainless steel, hastelloy, graphite, and other materials, as required by the specific use environment.

Rupture discs are widely accepted throughout industry and specified in most global pressure equipment design codes (American Society of Mechanical Engineers (ASME), Pressure Equipment Directive (PED), etc.). Rupture discs can be used to specifically protect installations against unacceptably high pressures or can be designed to act as one-time valves or triggering devices to initiate with high reliability and speed a sequence of actions required.

== Two disc technologies ==
There are two rupture disc technologies used in all rupture discs, forward-acting (tension loaded) and reverse buckling (compression). Both technologies can be paired with a bursting disc indicator to provide a visual and electrical indication of failure.

In the traditional forward-acting design, the loads are applied to the concave side of a domed rupture disc, stretching the dome until the tensile forces exceed the ultimate tensile stress of the material and the disc bursts. Flat rupture disc do not have a dome but, when pressure is applied, are still subject to tension loaded forces and are thus also forward-acting discs. The thickness of the raw material used in manufacturing (also known as web thickness in graphite discs) and the diameter of the disc determines the burst pressure. Most forward-acting discs are installed in systems with an 80% or lower operating ratio.

In later iterations on forward-acting disc designs, precision-cut or laser scores in the material during manufacturing were used to precisely weaken the material, allowing for more variables to control of the burst pressure. This approach to rupture discs, while effective, does have limitations. Forward-acting discs are prone to metal fatigue caused by pressure cycling and operating conditions that can spike past recommended limits for the disc, causing the disc to burst at lower than its marked burst pressure. Low burst pressures also pose a problem for this disc technology. As the burst pressure lowers, the material thickness decreases. This can lead to extremely thin discs (similar to tin foil) that are highly prone to damage and have a higher chance of forming pinhole leaks due to corrosion. These discs are still successfully used today and are preferred in some situations.

Reverse buckling rupture discs are the inversion of the forward-acting disc. The dome is inverted and the pressure is now loaded on the convex side of the disc. Once the reversal threshold is met, the dome will collapse and snap through to create a dome in the opposite direction. While that is happening, the disc is opened by knife blades or points of metal located along the score line on the downstream side of the disc. By loading the reverse buckling disc in compression, it is able to resist pressure cycling or pulsating conditions. The material thickness of a reverse buckling disc is significantly higher than that of a forward-acting disc of the same size and burst pressure. The result is greater longevity, accuracy and reliability over time. Correct installation of reverse buckling discs is essential. If installed upside down, the device will act as a forward acting disc and, due to the greater material thickness, may burst at much higher than the marked burst pressure.

== Blowout panel ==
Blowout panels, also called blow-off panels, areas with intentionally weakened structure, are used in enclosures, buildings or vehicles where a sudden overpressure may occur. By failing in a predictable manner, they channel the overpressure or pressure wave in the direction where it causes controlled, directed minimal harm, instead of causing a catastrophic failure of the structure. An alternative example is a deliberately weakened wall in a room used to store compressed gas cylinders; in the event of a fire or other accident, the tremendous energy stored in the (possibly flammable) compressed gas is directed into a "safe" direction, rather than potentially collapsing the structure in a similar manner to a thermobaric weapon.

=== Military applications ===
Blow-off panels are used in ammunition compartments of some tanks to protect the crew in case of ammunition explosion, turning a catastrophic kill into a lesser firepower kill. Blowout panels are installed in several modern main battle tanks, including the M1 Abrams.

In military ammunition storage, blowout panels are included in the design of the bunkers which house explosives. Such bunkers are designed, typically, with concrete walls on four sides, and a roof made of a lighter material covered with earth. In some cases this lighter material is wood, though metal sheeting is also employed. The design is such that if an explosion or fire in the ammunition bunker (also called a locker) were to occur, the force of the blast would be directed vertically, and away from other structures and personnel.

Blowout panels had been in the past been considered as a possible solution to magazine explosions on battleships. However battleship designs since the 1920s instead used the all or nothing armor scheme, particularly with its armored citadel encompassing the battleship's vitals including machinery and magazines, and in the case of magazine penetration the only recourse is to flood the magazine. The lack of blowout panels has resulted in catastrophic damage during the magazine explosions of several battleships including Tirpitz and Yamato.

== Applications in biology ==
Some models of gene gun also use a rupture disc, but not as a safety device. Instead, their function is part of the normal operation of the device, allowing for precise pressure-based control of particle application to a sample. In these devices, the rupture disc is designed to fail within an optimal range of gas pressure that has been empirically associated with successful particle integration into tissue or cell culture. Different disc strengths can be available for some gene gun models.
