= Prestressed structure =

Structure which contains permanent stresses to increase overall integrity

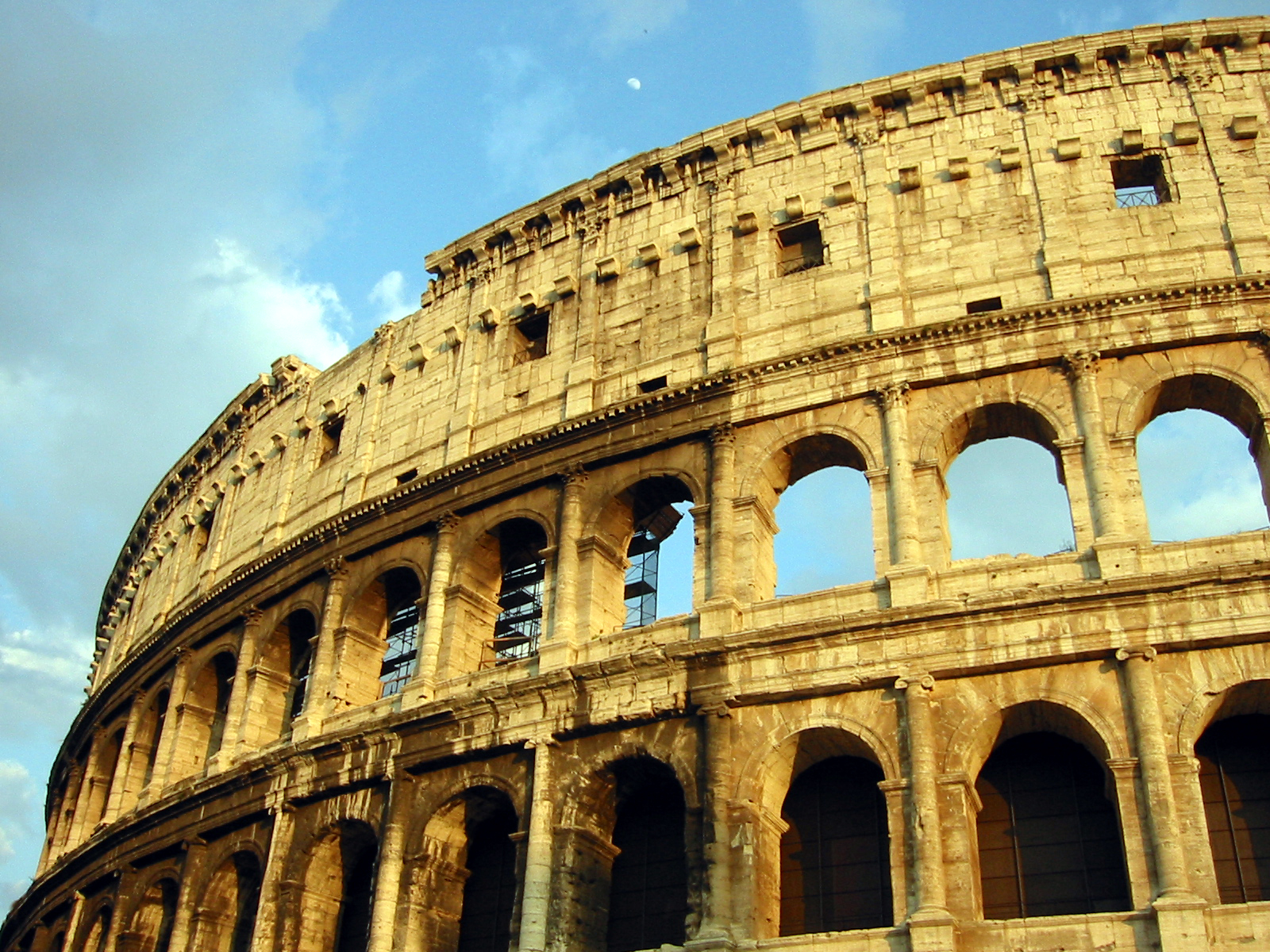
Naturally precompressed exterior wall of Colosseum, Rome

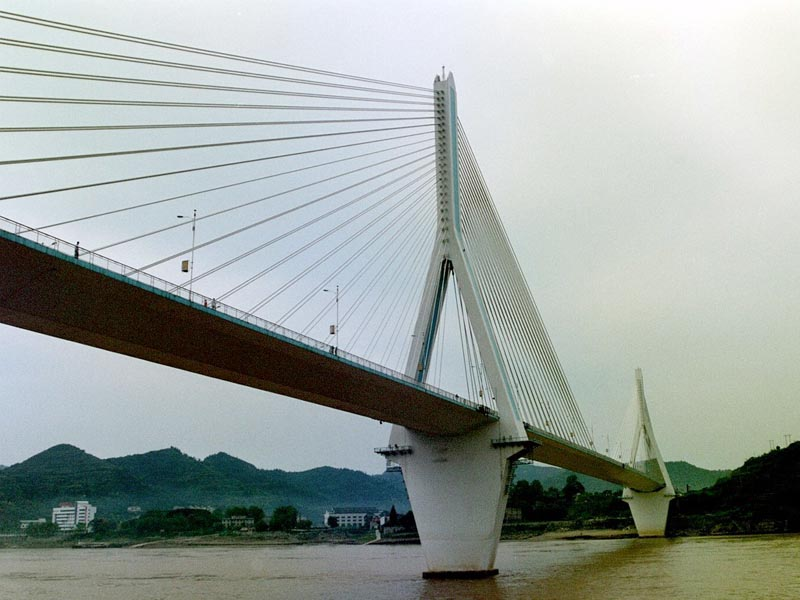
Cable-stayed prestressed concrete bridge over Yangtze river

In structural engineering, a prestressed structure is a load-bearing structure whose overall integrity, stability and security depend, primarily, on prestressing: the intentional creation of permanent stresses in the structure for the purpose of improving its performance under various service conditions.

The basic types of prestressing are:

- Precompression with mostly the structure's own weight
- Pre-tensioning with high-strength embedded tendons
- Post-tensioning with high-strength bonded or unbonded tendons

Today, the concept of a prestressed structure is widely employed in the design of buildings, underground structures, TV towers, power stations, floating storage and offshore facilities, nuclear reactor vessels, and numerous bridge systems. It is especially prominent in construction using concrete (see pre-stressed concrete).

The idea of precompression was apparently familiar to ancient Roman architects. The tall attic wall of the Colosseum works as a stabilizing device for the wall piers beneath it.
