= M14 mine =

Small anti-personnel land mine

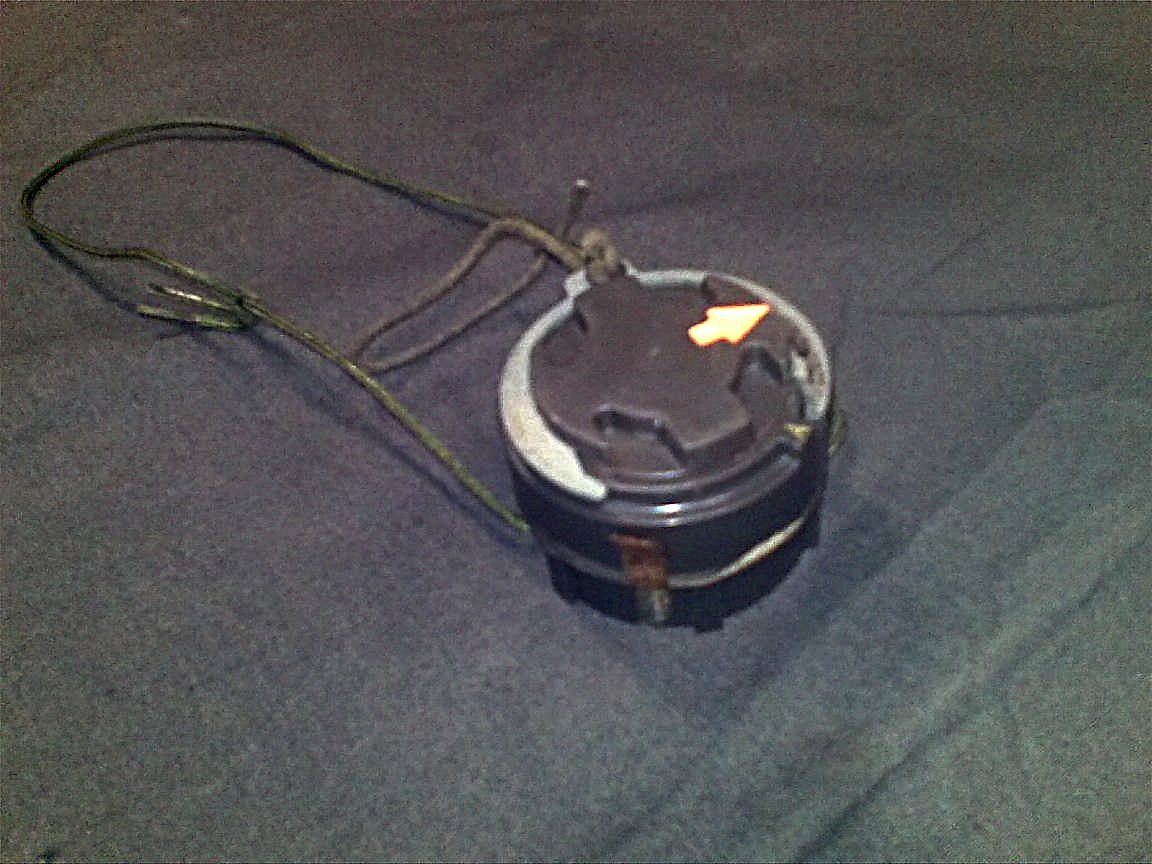
M14 mine with safety clip fitted. The U-shaped safety clip (with green pull-cord attached) and location of the yellow arrow on the pressure plate indicate that this mine has not been armed

The M14 mine "Toepopper" is a small (56 mm [2.2 in] diameter) anti-personnel land mine first deployed by the United States circa 1955. The M14 mechanism uses a belleville spring to flip a firing pin downwards into a stab detonator when pressure is applied. Once deployed, the M14 is very difficult to detect because it is a minimum metal mine, i.e. most of its components are plastic. Because of this, the design was later modified to ease mine clearance with the addition of a steel washer, glued onto the base of the mine.

== Deployment ==
In order to activate the M14, the base plug is removed and discarded and an M46 stab detonator is screwed into the base of the mine. Then the mine is placed into a shallow hole in the ground (flush with the surface) and the pressure plate is carefully rotated from its safety position to the armed position using the special arming spanner supplied in each crate of mines. Finally, the U-shaped metal safety clip is removed from the pressure plate by pulling on the attached cord. At this point, the mine is fully armed. When deployed by the US, M14s are often laid together with other mines in their inventory i.e. the M16, M15 or M19. In a "mixed minefield" the anti-tank mines protect anti-personnel mines and vice versa. Similarly, M14s can be laid among other mine-types manufactured by different nations e.g. alongside the PMA-2, VS-50, Valmara 69 or TM-62.

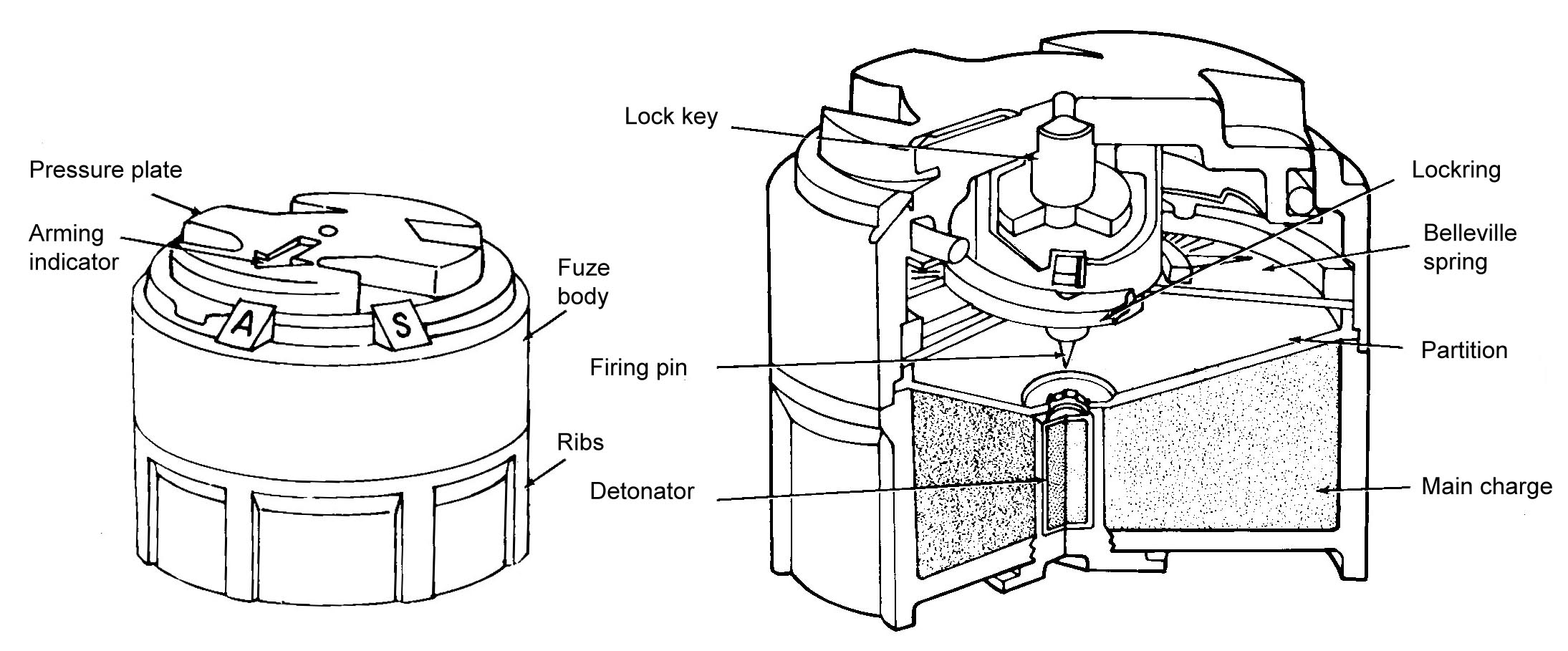
An M14 mine, showing a cutaway view. The absence of a U-shaped safety clip and the location of the arrow on the pressure plate show that this mine has been armed

The top of an M14 has a simple arming indicator (an arrow embossed on the pressure plate) which can point to either A(rmed) or S(afe), giving a clear indication of its status. When the arrow points to "A", the M14 will detonate if stepped on. Disarming the M14 requires the arming steps to be performed in reverse. However, due to the possibility of a booby trap or some other type of anti-handling device being fitted underneath, it is often standard demining practice to destroy land mines in place, without attempting to remove and disarm them.

The M14 has not been in active US service since 1974. However, as of 2010 the United States retains a stockpile of 1.5 million mines held in reserve for emergency use on the Korean peninsula, because they are regarded as reliable and effective weapons. This mine has been widely exported and used by various countries, so uncleared minefields containing M14s do exist. The M14 has been found in Angola, Cambodia, Chad, Chile, El Salvador, Eritrea, Ethiopia, Cyprus, Iran, Iraq, Jordan, Laos, Lebanon, Malawi, Mozambique, Somalia, Vietnam and Zambia. Additionally, copies of the M14 design have been manufactured locally by countries such as India and Vietnam. There are indications that as of 2008, an unlicensed copy of the M14 landmine was being manufactured in Burma by Myanmar Defense Products Industries at Ngyaung Chay Dauk, in Bago Division. The mine is extensively used by the local Burmese Army.

Just as with the VS-MK2 (33 gram explosive charge), SB-33 (35 gram charge) or PMA-3 (35 gram charge), the 29 grams of high explosive in an M14 mine is quite small because it is specifically designed to disable victims, not kill them. Although the blast wound from an M14 is unlikely to be fatal (assuming that prompt emergency medical care is provided) it usually destroys a significant part of the victim's foot, thereby leading to some form of permanent disability regarding their gait. The fact that the explosive charge in an M14 is slightly cone shaped (like a shaped charge) focuses most of the blast upwards, increasing its destructive effects. In situations where M14 victims are barefoot or wearing sandals (e.g. in Burma), the wounds are more severe. Due to the relative simplicity of the firing mechanism, the M14 mine is not resistant to blast-clearing methods, unlike more modern antipersonnel mine designs such as the TS-50 mine.

== Specifications ==
- Weight: 99 grams (3.5 oz)
- Explosive content: 29 grams (1 ounce) of tetryl
- Diameter: 56 mm (2.2 in)
- Height: 40 mm (1.6 in)
- Operating pressure: 9 to 13 kilograms
- Emplaced life expectancy:
  - In tropical conditions: 7 months
  - In temperate conditions: 20 years

== See also ==
- MD-82 mine—a close copy of the M14 mine manufactured by Vietnam
- List of land mines—provides extensive details
