= Valmara 69 =

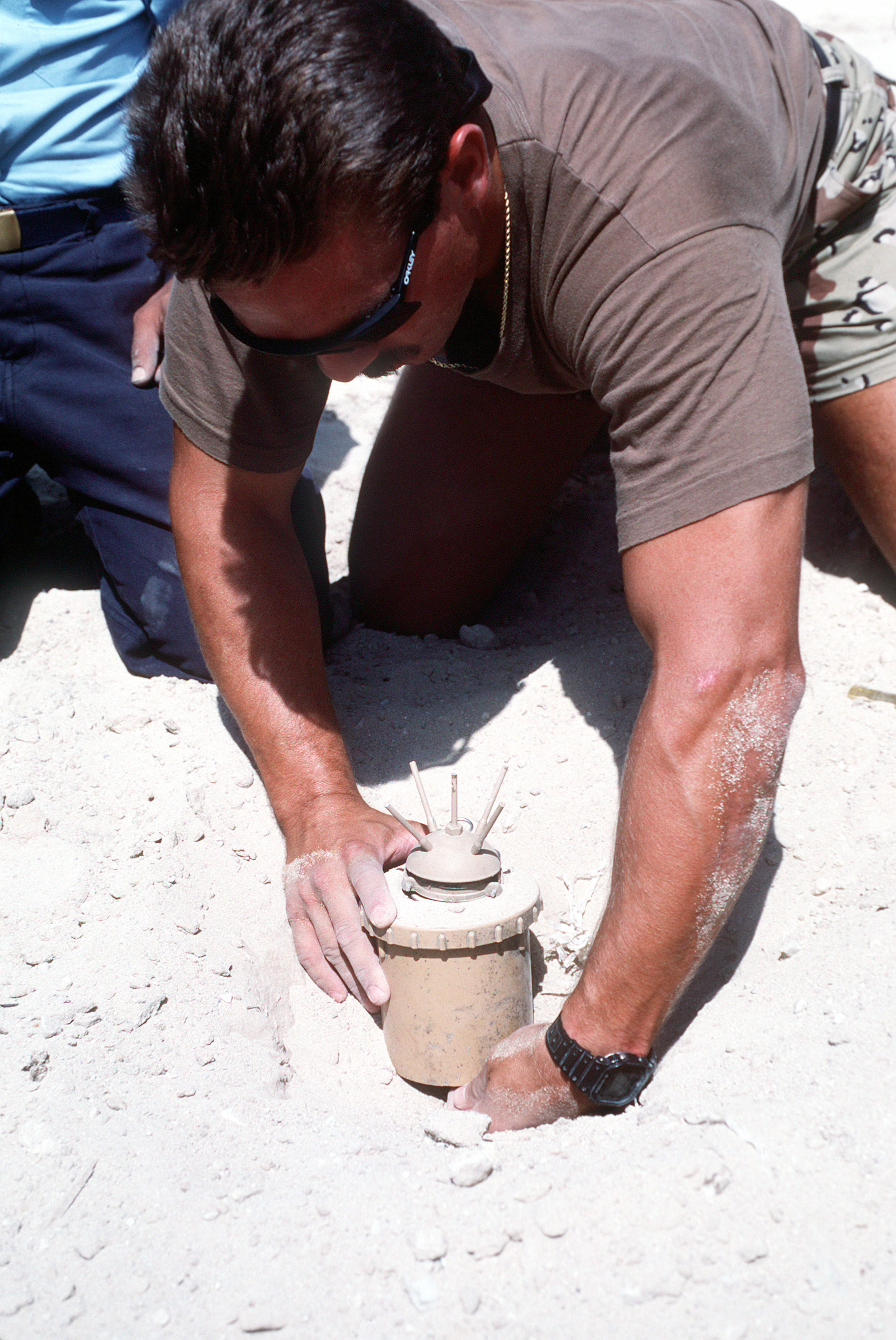
- A Valmara 69 mine during training by Explosive Ordnance Disposal (EOD) Team in Kuwait, 1992.
- Type: Bouncing anti-personnel mine
- Place of origin: Italy

Specifications
- Mass: 3.2 kg
- Height: 205 mm
- Diameter: 130 mm
- Filling: Composition B
- Filling weight: 0.42 kg
- Detonation mechanism: 10 kg push or 6 kg pull

Valmara 69 or V-69 is an Italian bounding anti-personnel mine manufactured by Valsella. The mine was developed from the V-59 mine, and although the mine is no longer produced in Italy, a number of copies were produced in other countries e.g. the all-plastic anti-metal detection "SPM-1" manufactured by Singapore.

The South African version was called the J-69, and was an identical copy of the Italian version. A single centre prong version was also produced. It is no longer produced by South Africa who are compliant with the Mine Ban Treaty requirements.

== Description ==
The mine has a short tubular olive green or sand colored plastic body inside which is the steel bounding body of the mine. On top of the mine is a round fuze cap with five prongs. The mine is triggered when the fuze cap tilts, either because of pressure on one of the prongs or a pull on an attached tripwire. The tilting fuze mechanism is not affected by overpressure. When the mine is triggered, a spring-loaded firing pin fires a percussion cap inside the fuze, which ignites a propelling charge at the base of the mine. The propellant charge launches the mine up out of the ground and into the air.

When the mine reaches a height of approximately 50 cm above ground, which takes less than one second, an integral tether wire (connecting it to the plastic body from which it was launched) tugs on a spring-loaded firing pin in the body of the mine, which detonates the main explosive charge. Embedded in a plastic fragmentation sleeve surrounding the main explosive charge are approximately 1,000 pre-cut steel fragments, which are projected at high velocity in all directions. The mine has a lethal radius of 25 m, but the fragments remain dangerous at a considerable distance beyond that, e.g. can inflict deeply penetrating eye wounds.

This mine has significant metal content, which makes it easy to find using a metal detector. However, like the majority of bounding mines, most of the Valmara 69 is hidden underground and may be difficult to see, particularly in heavy undergrowth. Additionally, the Valmara 69 may be laid along with minimum metal mines such as the VS-50, VS MK2, TS-50, SB-33 and SB-81, which complicates the clearance process.

Valsella also manufactured a completely separate electronic anti-handling device known as the VS-AR. This was a tilt-operated device, specifically designed to be fitted to any of the following Valsella products: the VS-50 (standard version, not the VS-50AR) and Valmara 69 anti-personnel mines, as well as the VS-1.6 and VS-1.2 anti-tank mines. The VS-AR4 has a series of fuze adaptors which allow it to be screwed into the bottom of any of those mines. It has a 10-minute mechanical arming delay (started by removing a pin) followed by a 30-minute electronic arming delay. The power source are two 1.5 V batteries and the operational life is longer than a year.

The Valmara 69 is found in Angola, Egypt, Iran, Iraq, Turkey, Kuwait, Mozambique, Sudan, and the Western Sahara

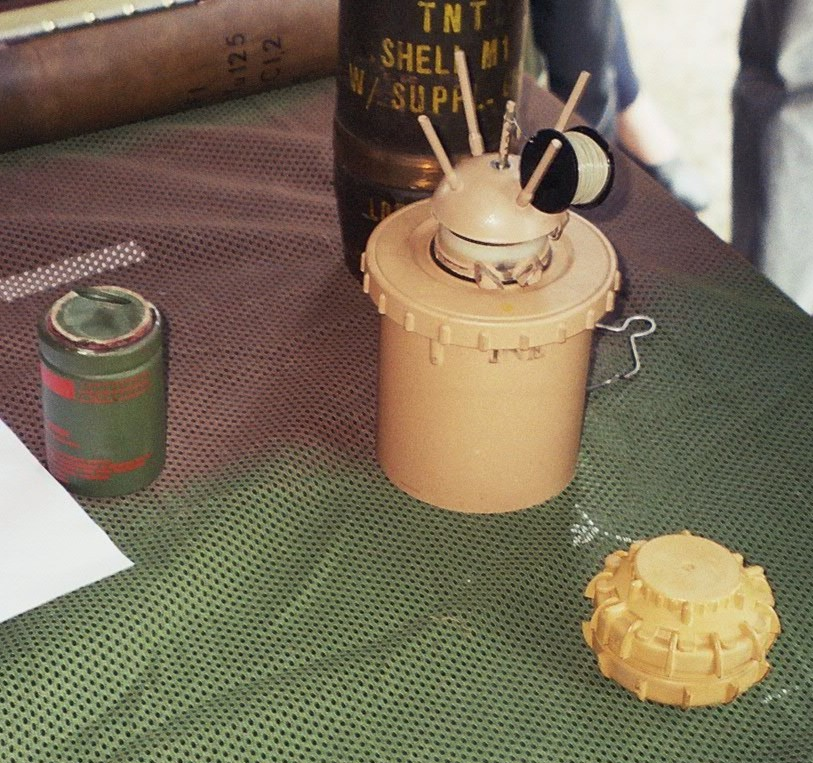
Three land mines: the Valmara 69 is in the middle

== See also ==
- Valmara 59 – (Italy)
- PROM-1 – (Yugoslavia)
