= CS 42/2 mine =

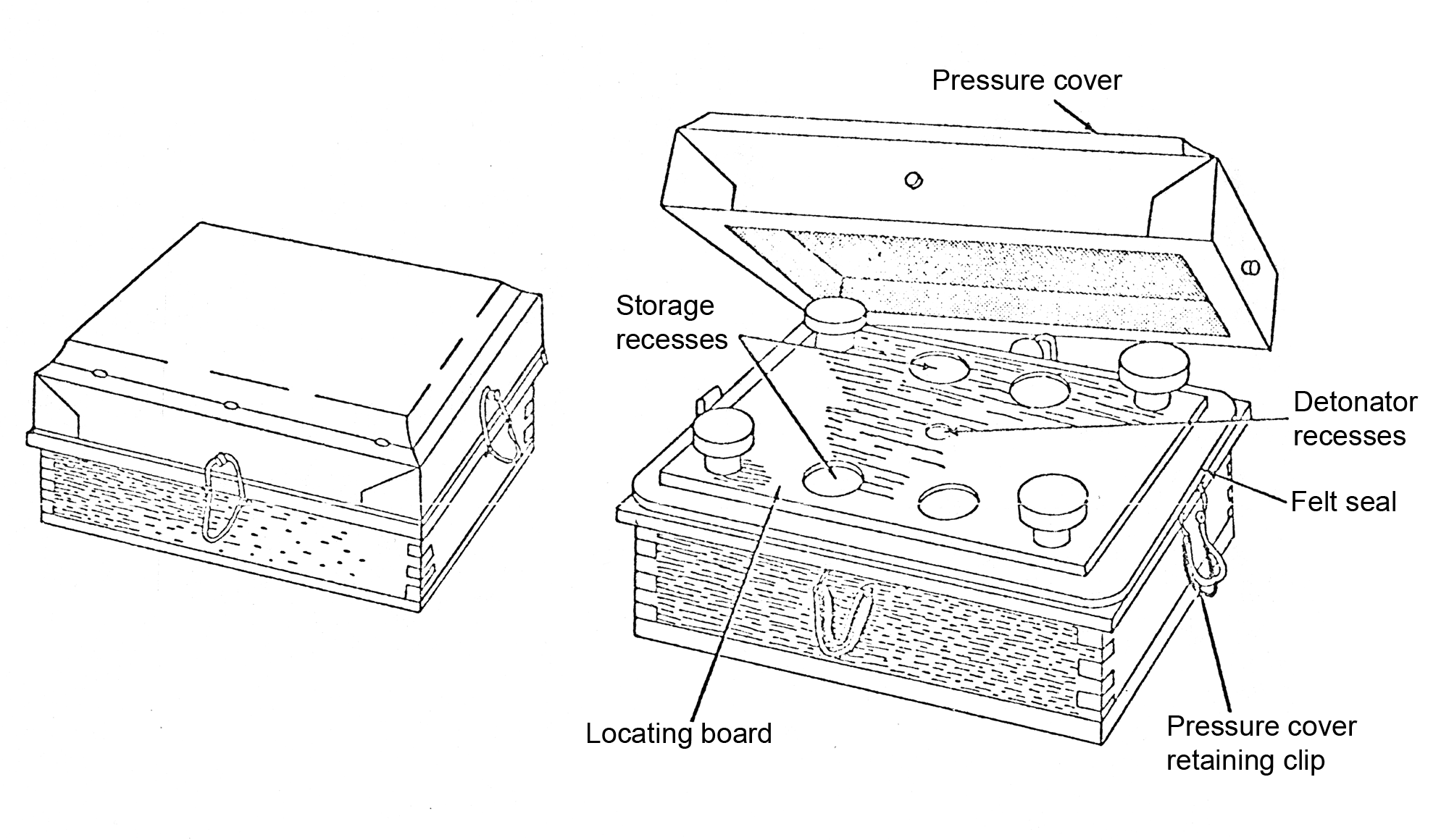
A diagram of the mine showing the four fuzes and storage recesses.

The CS 42/2 is an Italian wooden cased anti-tank mine used during the Second World War. The mine uses four PMC 43 buttons, which can be substituted for Model 42/2 fuzes to make it function as an Anti-personnel mine.

== Specifications ==
- Dimensions: 340 x 289 x 160 millimeters
- Operating pressure: 220 lbs
- Explosive content: 11 lbs of TNT
