= PMA-3 =

PMA-3 may refer to:

- PMA-3 mine, a Yugoslavian anti-personnel mine
- Pressurized Mating Adapter-3, a spacecraft adapter used in the International Space Station
