= PMA-3 mine =

Anti-personnel mine

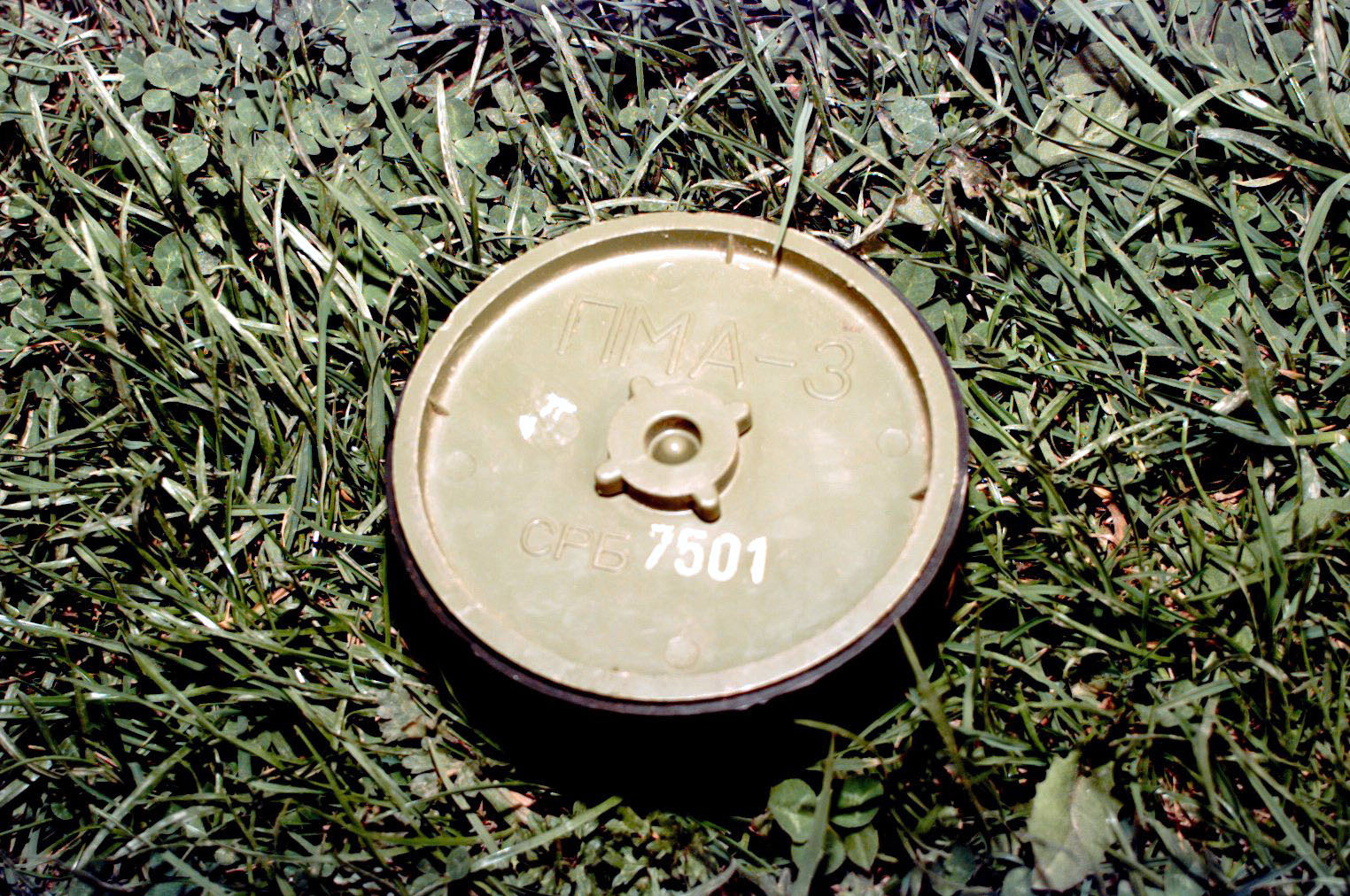
View of the underside of a PMA-3 landmine. Note the edge of the rubber cover and the central plug for the detonator.

The PMA-3 is a Yugoslavian blast resistant minimum metal anti-personnel mine. It is circular, consisting of a plastic upper and lower half joined together by a rubber cover. A safety collar is normally wrapped around the outside of the mine, preventing the upper half of the mine tilting when in transit. Once deployed the safety collar is removed. Sufficient pressure on the top surface of the mine causes it to tilt. The tilting drives a pin through a friction sensitive pyrotechnic compound, which fires the detonator and then the main explosive charge.

Straight downward pressure does not have the shearing component needed to trigger the mine, this gives the mine blast resistance, since blast overpressure bears down evenly on the top surface of the mine.

The mine has a relatively low explosive content, so will maim rather than kill. Its blast resistance combined with the lack of metal in the mine make it extremely difficult to clear.

PMA-3 mines can be found in minefields in Albania, Bosnia, Cambodia, Chad, Chile, Croatia, Serbia, Lebanon, Namibia and Peru.

== Specifications ==
- Height: 40 mm
- Diameter: 111 mm
- Weight: 0.18 kg
- Explosive content: 35 grams of Tetryl or possibly TNT

== See also ==
- PMA-2 mine
- PROM-1
