= M86 pursuit deterrent munition =

M86 PDM
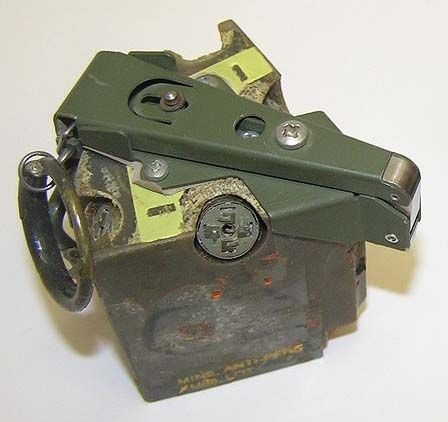
- Top view of the M86, displaying the safety pin, arming strap assembly, and spring-loaded triplines (the circular cutouts along the edges)
- Type: Bounding antipersonnel mine
- Place of origin: United States

Production history
- Designed: before 1977
- Variants: ADAM Mine

Specifications
- Mass: 1.2 lb
- Effective firing range: 40 feet (12 m)
- Filling: Comp A5
- Filling weight: 21 grams

The M86 pursuit deterrent munition (PDM) is a small United States anti-personnel mine intended to be used by special forces to deter pursuing enemy forces. The M86 was seen in American arsenals as early as 1977.

== Description ==
The M86 anti-personnel mine is to be deployed as a deterrent munition by special forces or selected personnel only on operations where they may be pursued by an enemy.

The M86 mine is similar in configuration and possesses functioning characteristics of the ADAM mine presently loaded in the 155 mm projectile, M731 (and M692). The mine is wedge-shaped, and contains a safety clip, arming strap assembly, internal safety and arming device, seven trip-line sensor, a reserve battery, electronic circuitry containing an IC chip, and a kill mechanism surrounded by an overlay containing a liquid propellant, and encapsulated in a moulded plastic form.

The M86 antipersonnel mine is manually armed by removing the safety clip and then the arming strap assembly. A camming action breaks the shorting bar and forces the battery ball against the battery breaking the glass ampule containing an electrolyte which activates the reserve battery and provides power. The shorting bar hook, attached to the cam, shears the shorting bar (a safety device across the detonator). After a 60-second (nominal) electronic time delay, a piston actuator in the Safe and Arm (S&A) mechanism is electrically fired, moving a slider to align the detonator with an explosive lead in the slider. At the same time, seven sensor trip-lines are released. Approximately three or four trip-lines will deploy up to 20 feet from the mine, depending upon the at-rest position of the mine. The remaining trip-lines may be hindered due to their proximity to the resting surface. After an additional 10-second electronic time delay, allowing the munition to return to equilibrium, the mine is fully armed electronically. Disturbance of a trip-line, or the mine itself, now triggers a switch which completes an electronic firing circuit. The S&A electric detonator initiates the S&A firing train which initiates a detonating cord which then initiates a thin layer of liquid propellant, which by gravity rests under the kill mechanism, shattering the plastic mine body and propelling the kill mechanism upwards from 6 inches to 8 feet above the ground where it detonates. The kill mechanism is a spheroid internally embossed and loaded with 21 grams of Comp A5 and when detonated, propels fragments in a high velocity spherical pattern.

If the mine is not activated by trip-line or disturbance mode, a factory preset self-destruct feature initiates the mine in 4 hours plus 0-20%.

== Dimensions ==
- Height: 3.203 in
- Radius (max): 2.924 in
- Thickness: 72° wedge

== See also ==
- Land mine
