= PMA-2 mine =

Yugoslavian Anti-Personnel mine

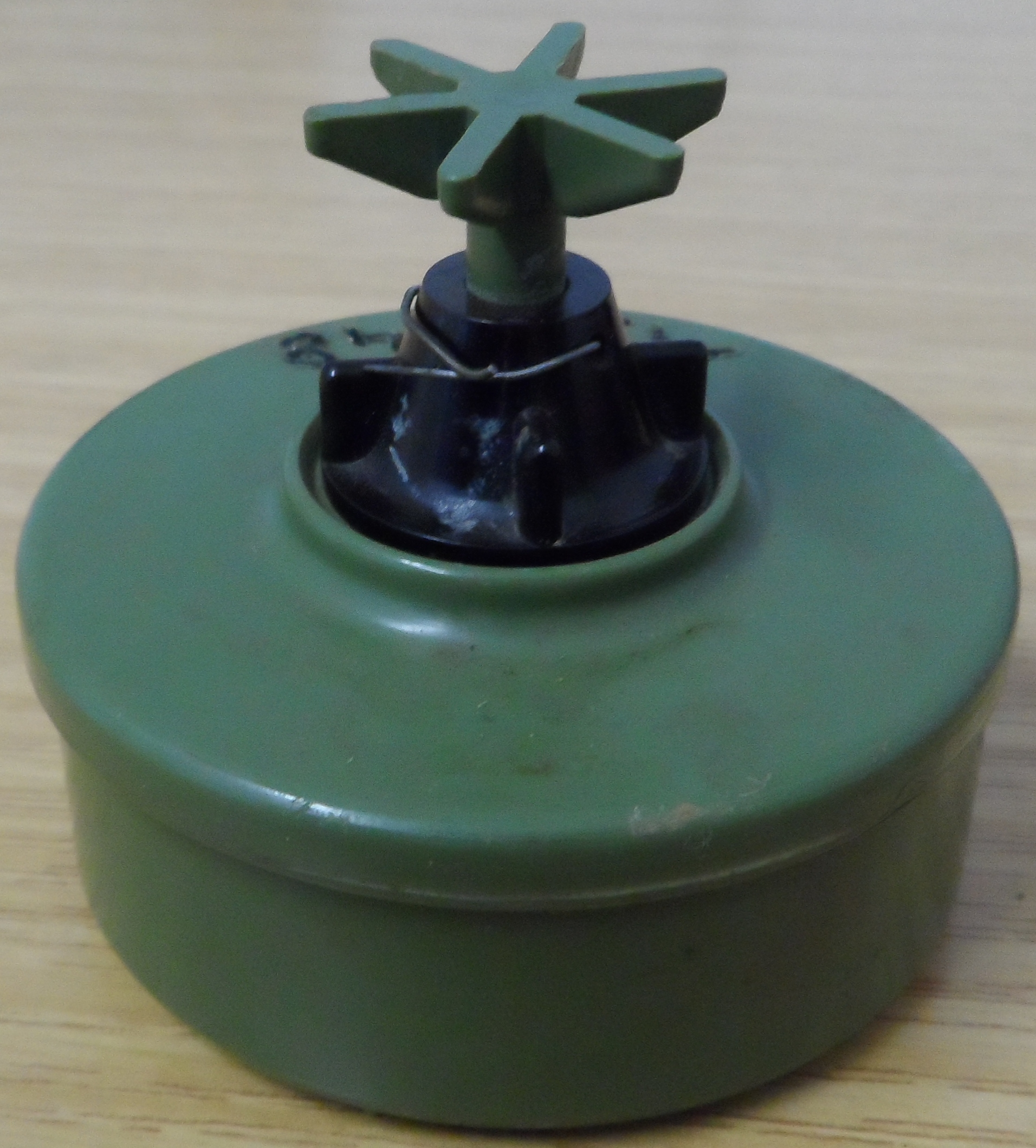
A PMA-2 mine

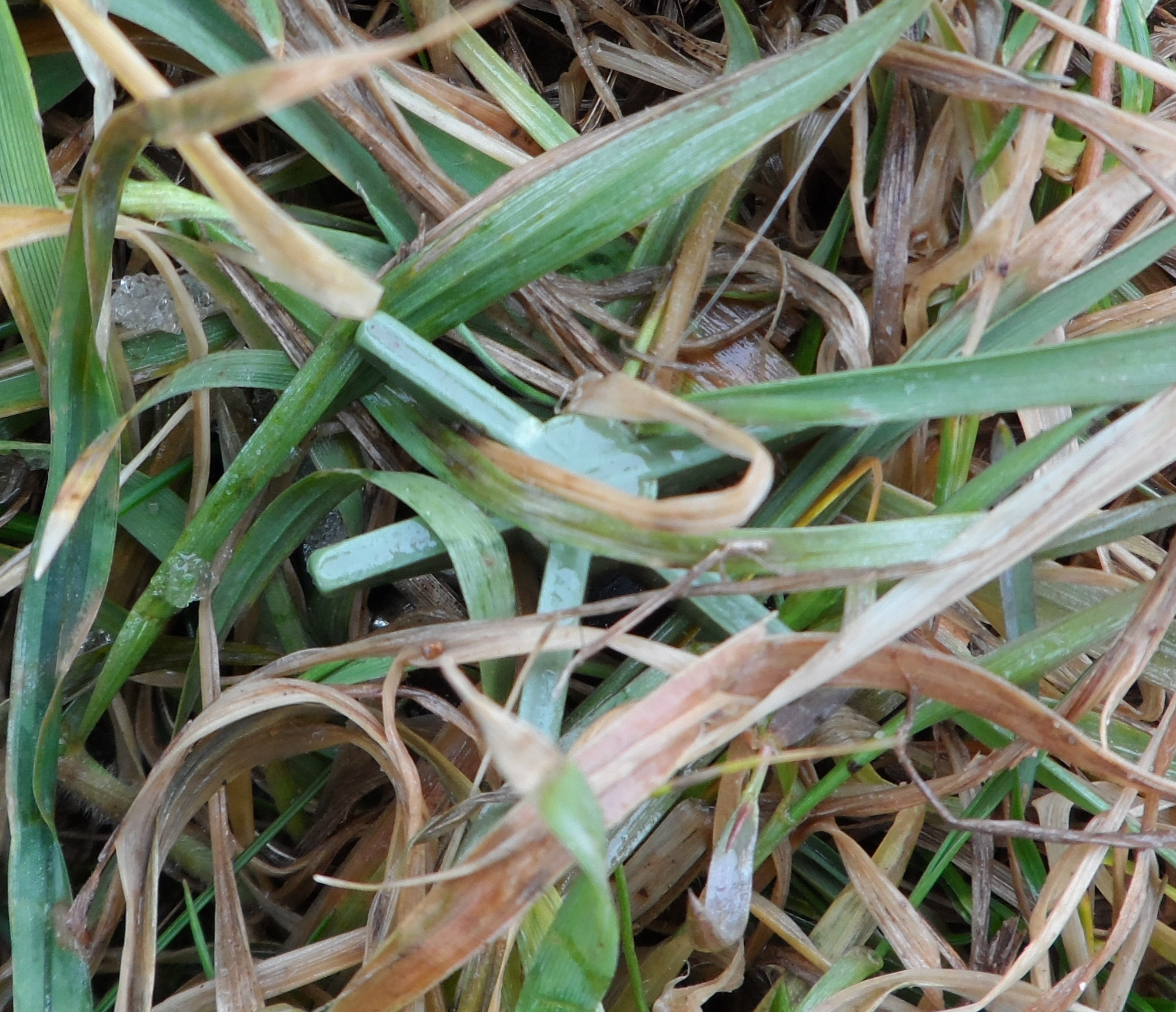
A PMA-2 mine emplaced in the ground, showing how it blends in with the undergrowth

The PMA-2 is a Yugoslavian blast antipersonnel mine. Sometimes referred to as the 'Pašteta', due to its superficial resemblance to a meat-pâté tin. The mine is constructed from dark green plastic, with a distinctive plunger which has six petals radiating from it. Can detonate even to this day.

== Overview ==
The mine is armed by removing a pin which blocks the downward travel of the six-pronged plunger. After removing the arming pin, sufficient pressure on the plunger (by the victim's foot) forces it downwards into the main fuze body, which ignites a friction-sensitive pyrotechnic composition. The burning pyrotechnic composition flashes through to the detonator which fires, initiating a small RDX booster pellet which in turn detonates the main TNT explosive charge.

Generally, PMA-2 mines are buried in such a way that only the star-shaped plunger is visible above ground. However, although this mine is not completely concealed (unlike so many others), it can be very difficult to spot it, particularly in heavy undergrowth or leaf litter.

Note: this mine can also be emplaced in other ways to hinder visual detection and/or the demining process. For example, sometimes PMA-2 mines are emplaced completely upside down with only a centimetre of the base showing above ground level. Alternatively, they may be buried diagonal to the ground surface, in such a way that the star-shaped plunger (now completely hidden underground) is facing a deminer's clearance probe. A minefield containing PMA-2 mines may have them emplaced in some or all of the three different ways described.

This mine is resistant to traditional explosive mine countermeasures, which use sudden blast overpressure to detonate mines. Additionally, the PMA-2 is a minimum metal mine, containing only a tiny amount of aluminium in the fuze.

Although the blast wound from a PMA-2 mine is unlikely to be fatal, it usually destroys the victim's foot, thereby leading to some form of permanent disability regarding their gait.

Examples of the PMA-2 mine have been found in Albania, Angola, Bosnia, Cambodia, Croatia, Serbia, Zimbabwe and Namibia.

=== Specifications ===
- Weight: 135 g
- Explosive weight: 95 grams TNT
- Fuze: UPMAH-2
- Diameter: 68 mm
- Height: 61 mm
- Operating pressure: 7 kilograms (approx)

== See also ==
- PMA-3 mine
- PROM-1
