= Blast resistant mine =

Class of military explosives

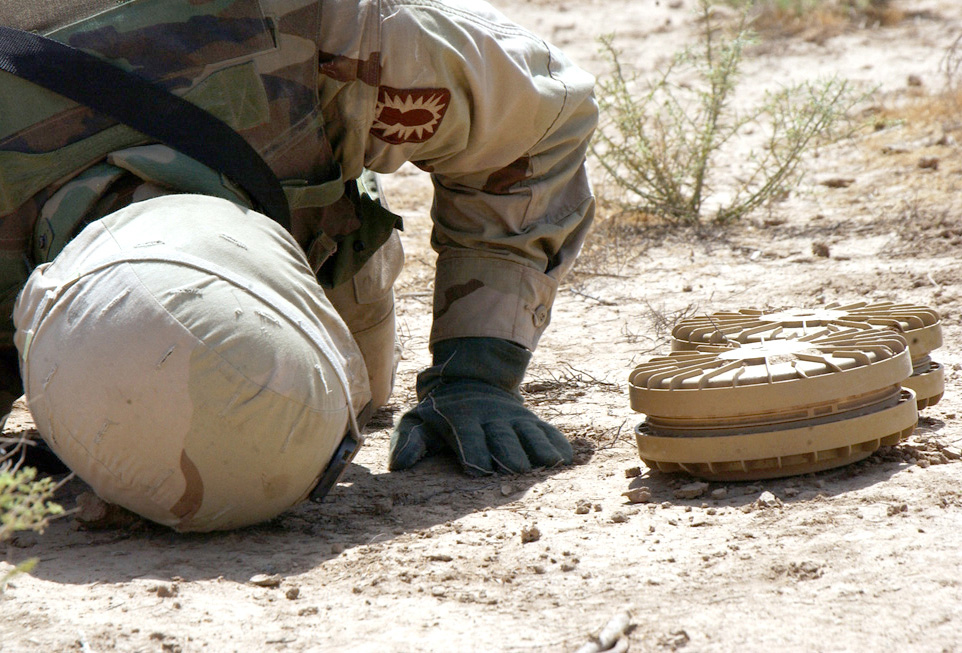
A soldier examines two inverted VS-1.6 blast-resistant anti-tank landmines.

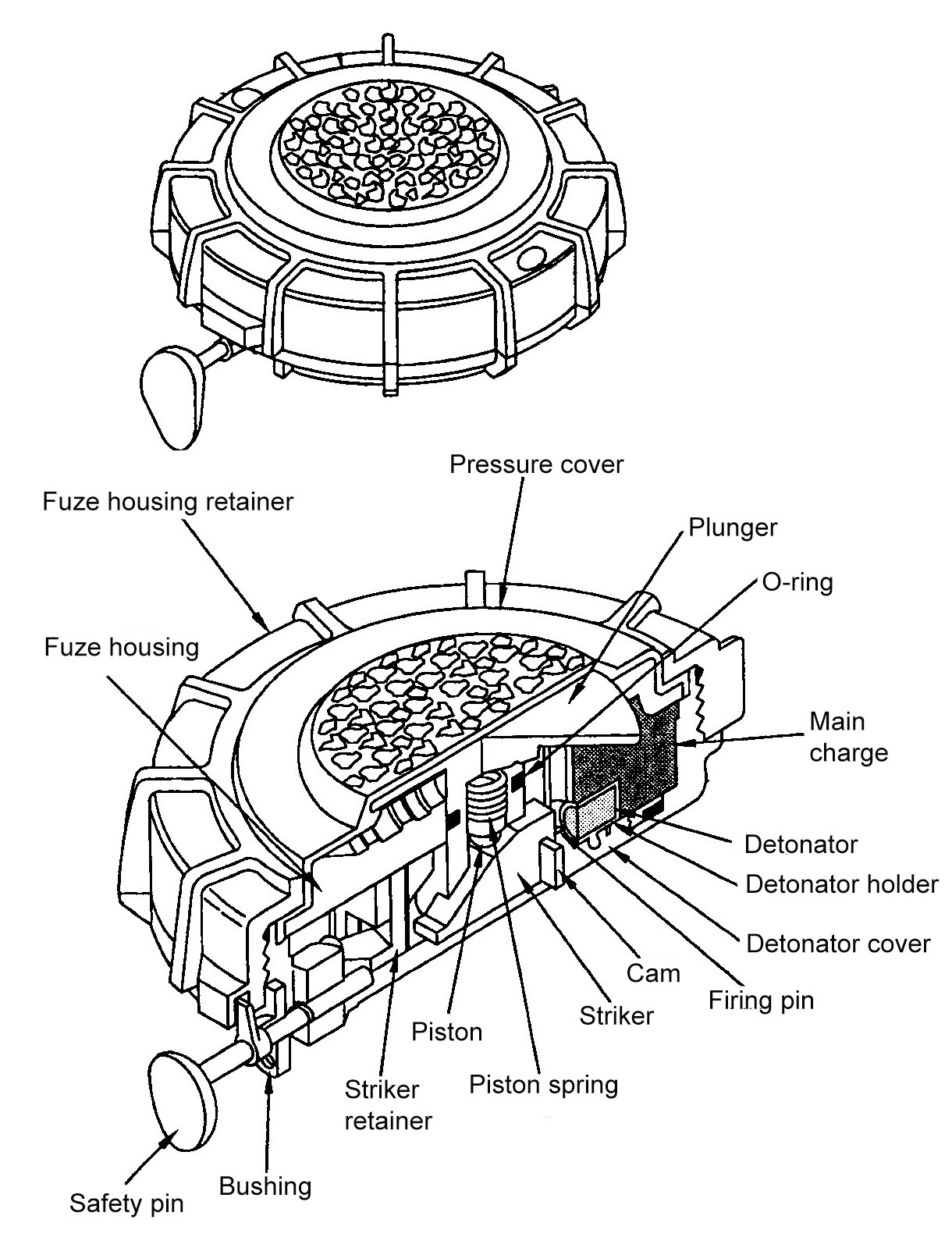
Cut-away view of a VS-MK2 blast-resistant anti-personnel mine

A blast resistant mine is a landmine (intended for anti-tank or anti-personnel purposes) with a fuze which is designed to be insensitive to the shock wave from a nearby explosion. This feature makes it difficult or impossible to clear such mines using explosive minefield breaching techniques. As a result, the process of clearing minefields is slower and more complex. Blast resistance can be achieved in a number of ways.

== Pressure blast resistant fuzes ==
In pressure fuzed landmines this is achieved by having the fuze react differently based on the duration of the pressure impulse. For example, a number of Italian landmines like the VS-1.6 use an air system, where air is forced through a small hole into an air bladder, the inflation of which rotates a locking collar and releases the striker into the detonator. The sudden impulse from impact or explosion does not have sufficient duration to inflate the bladder and rotate the locking collar, whereas steady pressure from a vehicle's wheel or track does.

A second technique involves the use of tilt or pull, rather than downward pressure to trigger the mine. An example of a mine using this technique is the Valmara 69.

A third technique involves the use of a pressure plate with a small surface area yet broad ground coverage like the M1 mine. This is less effective than the first two techniques, but much simpler to implement.

== Non-pressure blast resistant fuzes ==
The use of electronic fuzes allows mines to intelligently ignore blast shock waves, by either being designed to ignore the characteristics of a blast shock wave or by using the characteristic magnetic field of the target to detonate the mine. Additionally seismic fuzes can be used to detonate mines, based on the characteristic sounds of footsteps or vehicles.

== See also ==
- Minimum metal mine
- Anti-handling device
- VS-50 mine - blast resistant anti-personnel mine
- TS-50 mine - blast resistant anti-personnel mine
- SB-33 mine - blast resistant anti-personnel mine
- SB-81 mine - blast resistant anti-tank mine
- TC/3.6 and TC/6 mines - blast resistant anti-tank mine
