= Glasmine 43 =

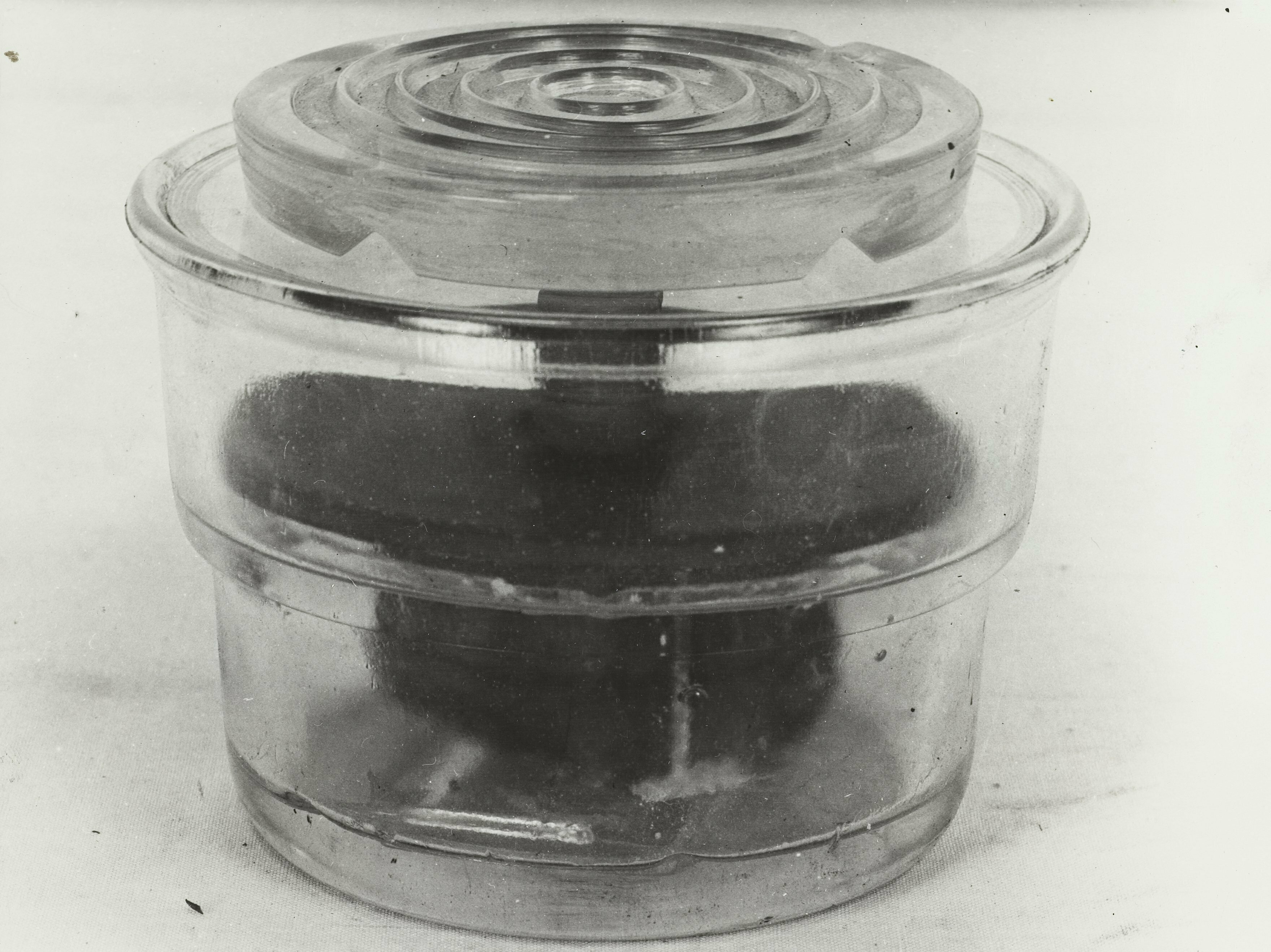
- Glasmine 43
- Type: Minimum metal anti-personnel mine
- Place of origin: Germany

Service history
- In service: 1944–1945
- Used by: Germany
- Wars: World War II

Production history
- Produced: 1944–1945
- No. built: 11 million
- Variants: Hebelzünder 44 detonator; Buck chemical detonator

Specifications
- Height: 6 inches (150 mm)
- Diameter: 4.5 inches (110 mm)
- Filling: TNT
- Filling weight: 200 grams (7.1 oz)
- Detonation mechanism: Pressure – weight of around 40 pounds (18 kg)

The Glasmine 43 was an anti-personnel mine with a glass body used by Nazi Germany during World War II.

This mine was an early minimum metal mine, designed to reduce the likelihood of detection by the Polish mine detector then in use by Allied forces. The use of glass instead of metal helped conserve valuable war materials.

== Description ==
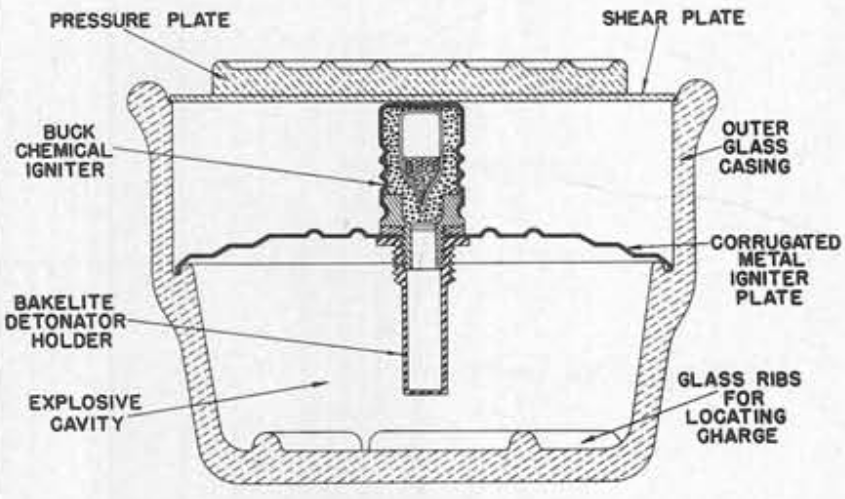
Diagram of a Glasmine 43 from a US Army manual

The mine consists of a glass bowl, six inches (15 cm) in diameter containing an explosive charge and a detonator. The top of the mine was covered by a sheet-glass disk 0.25 inches (6.4 mm) thick, under a thick, moulded glass pressure plate. Each mine was supplied with a small quantity of cement putty to seal gaps between the main body and the glass disk cover and make the mine waterproof.

When stepped on, the pressure plate shattered the glass disk and activated the detonator, detonating the mine's main explosive charge. This was a Sprengkörper 28 – a standard demolition charge with 200 grams (7.1 oz) of explosive. Two types of detonators were used. Early versions of the mine used a mechanical detonator, known as a Hebelzünder 44 which used a percussion cap. Later versions fired the main charge using a device known as a Buck igniter.

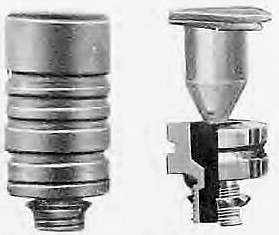
Buck igniter

The Buck igniter was a small can of thin, corrugated aluminium. This contained a glass ampoule of sulfuric acid, surrounded by flash powder that included powdered naphthalene. The can crushed when subjected to a force equivalent to around five pounds (2.3 kg), shattering the ampoule and causing the acid to mix with the powder. The resulting chemical reaction produced a flash that ignited the detonator of the main explosive charge.

In 1944 and 1945, 11 million mines were produced; at the end of World War II, 9.7 million were still in stock. Along with other companies, the Glashütte Gifhorn participated in the production.

== Effect and legacy ==
Glass shrapnel was not easily detectable via X-rays, which rendered medical assistance to victims much harder than conventional mines. Glass made life-threatening injuries more difficult to assess.

Mines of this type are still buried in the Eifel National Park on the grounds of the Vogelsang Military Training Area, a former "Nazi leadership" training center.

Demining areas with this type of mine is resource intensive, as the fields must be swept either by hand or with mine flails like the Keiler, not forgetting that the latter has a certain margin of error since it was developed with military-tactical deployments in mind (creating pathways through minefields).

In 2004, the Colombian Government claimed that "home-made" glass mines were employed by guerrillas in Colombia.
