= VS-50 mine =

Italian anti-personnel mine

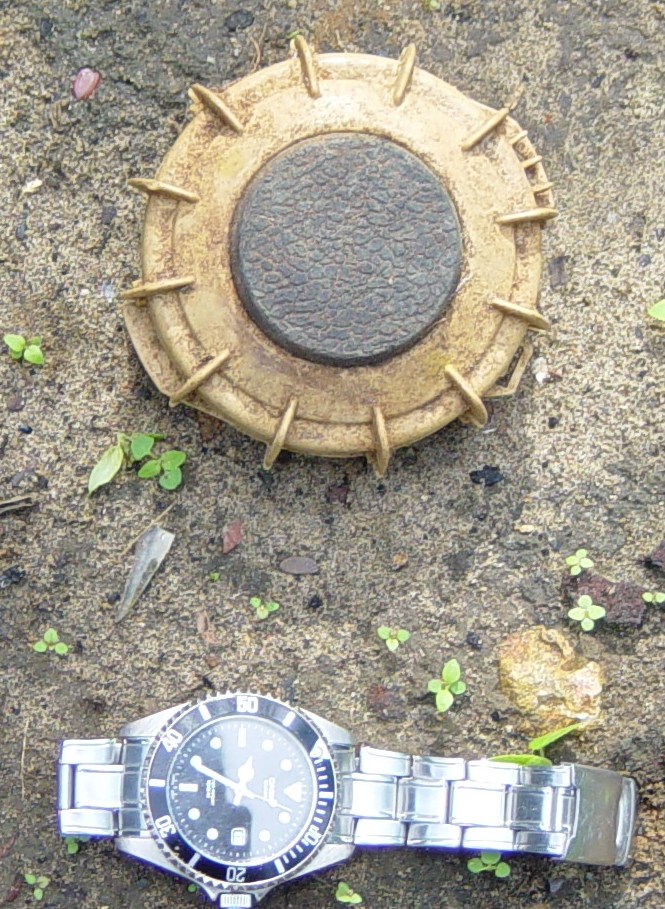
VS-50 mine

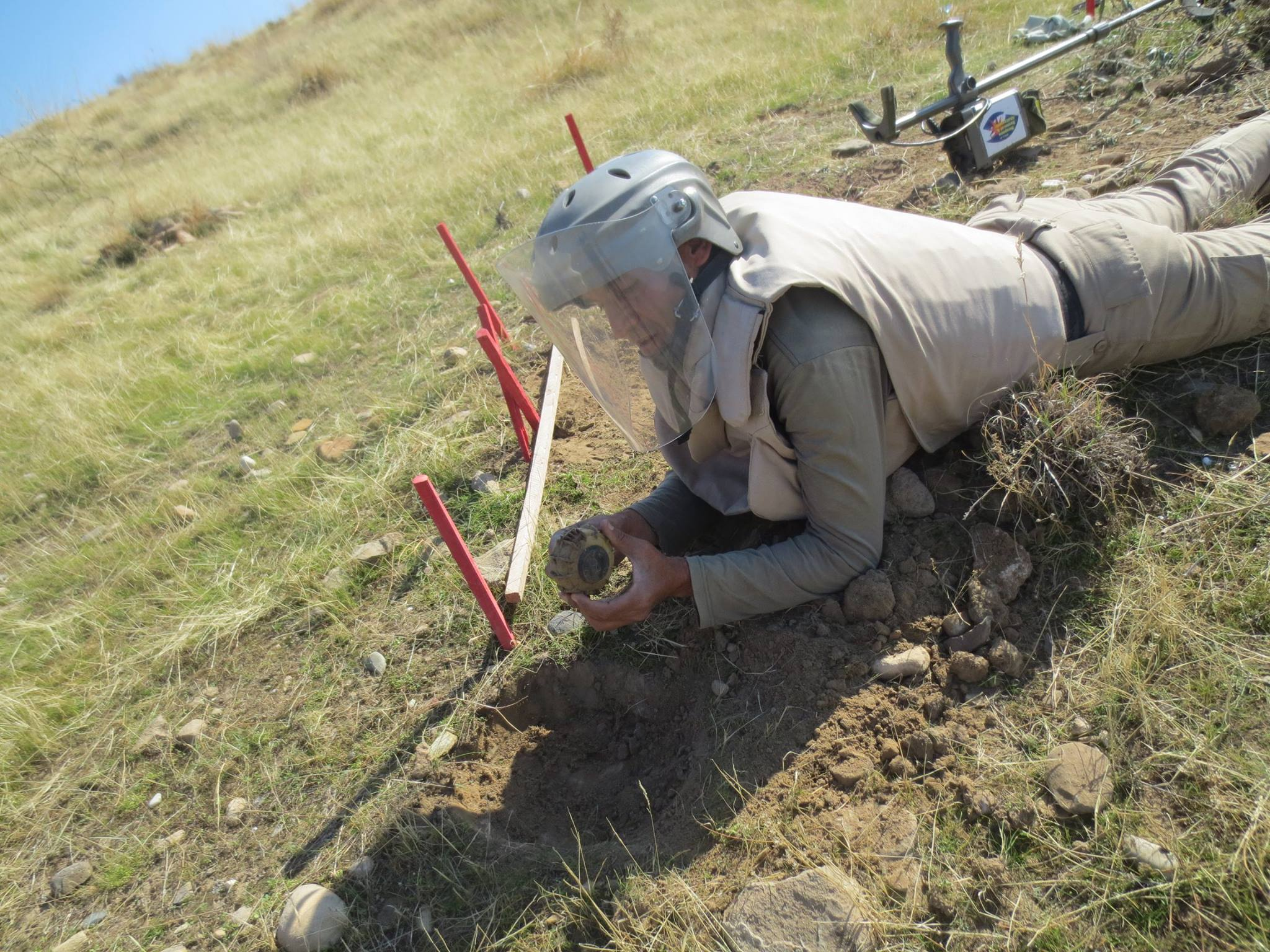
A deminer from non-governmental organisation MAG (Mines Advisory Group) disarms a VS-50 landmine in Dohuk governorate, West Region of Iraq

The VS-50 is a circular plastic-cased anti-personnel blast mine that entered production in 1985. It was formerly made by the now-defunct Valsella Meccanotecnica SpA, an Italian high-tech defence company specialized in area denial systems, then produced in limited quantities in Egypt and Iran, and mass-production in Singapore, one of the world's largest producers of land and sea mines. The company also made the Valmara 69, and was one of the first to implement plastic construction for landmines. The VS-50's design is similar to that of the TS-50 and VS-MK2 mines. It is blast resistant and can be used in a minimum metal configuration. Though unlikely to kill, its explosive charge is quite sufficient to destroy the victim's foot, being capable of penetrating 5 mm of mild steel leaving an 80 mm-diameter hole.

== Description ==
The mine consists of three sections, a bottom section containing the main explosive charge, a middle section which contains the fuze and safety/arming mechanism, and the top section which consists of a neoprene pressure pad. The neoprene pressure pad is sometimes reinforced with an 18 gram mild steel plate, which makes the mine detectable by metal detectors. However, the majority of VS-50s were manufactured as minimal metal mines and are therefore much harder to detect. The case is waterproof and can be used in water up to one metre deep. The mine can be deployed by helicopters or ground vehicles or laid by hand.

== Operation ==
A sustained downward force of approximately ten kilograms on the pressure plate for a minimum of 0.10 seconds compresses the firing spring and cocks the striker. Continuous downward movement allows the trigger assembly to pivot, slowly forcing the air out of an anti-shock bladder and flips the striker down into the stab sensitive M41 detonator, at which point the mine explodes.

The air pressure delay mechanism effectively blocks detonation if the force on the pressure plate is of short duration, because air does not have enough time to leave the small anti-shock bladder. This has two direct applications: allowing the mine to be dropped from helicopter mine scattering systems, and dramatically increasing the mine's resistance to explosive-based mine clearance techniques. It can therefore be regarded as a blast resistant mine.

== VS-50AR and VS-AR4 anti-handling devices ==
The VS-50AR is an electronically fuzed version of the mine which contains an integral mercury tilt switch, that operates as an anti-handling device. The VS-50AR has a dummy pressure plate on top and its external appearance is very similar to the VS-50, which has obvious implications for demining personnel. The VS-50AR contains a reduced explosive charge, but which is still sufficient to blow the victim's hands off.

Additionally, Valsella manufactured a completely separate electronic anti-handling device known as the VS-AR4. This was a tilt-operated device, specifically designed to be fitted to any of the following Valsella products: the VS-50 (standard version, not the VS-50AR) and Valmara 69 anti-personnel mines, as well as the VS-1.6 and VS-1.2 anti-tank mines. The VS-AR4 has a series of fuze adaptors which allow it to be screwed into the bottom of any of those mines. It has a 10-minute mechanical arming delay (started by removing a pin) followed by a 30-minute electronic arming delay. The power source are two 1.5 V batteries and the operational life is longer than a year.

Generally, the render safe procedure for VS-50 mines with anti-handling devices fitted is to detonate them in place via a donor charge, or burn through the plastic casing using some form of special incendiary device.

== Usage ==
The mine has been encountered in Afghanistan, Angola, Ecuador, Iraq, Turkey, Kuwait, Lebanon, Peru, Rwanda, Sri Lanka, the Western Sahara and Zimbabwe.

== Produced by ==
- Italy
- Iran
- Egypt
- Singapore

== Specifications ==
- Weight: 185 g
- Explosive content: 43 g of phlegmatized RDX (i.e. RDX and paraffin wax)
- Diameter: 90 mm
- Height: 45 mm
- Operating pressure: 10 kg

== Variants ==
- VS-50 EO3 – version fitted with an electronic anti-handling device
- SPM-1 – mass-produced under a twice-extended 25-years licence in Singapore since 1987
- YM-IB – copy produced by Iran
- T/79 – copy produced by Egypt

== See also ==
- TS-50 mine – (Italy)
- VS-MK2 mine – (Italy)
- TC/6 mine – (Italy)
