= VS-MK2 mine =

Anti-personnel mine

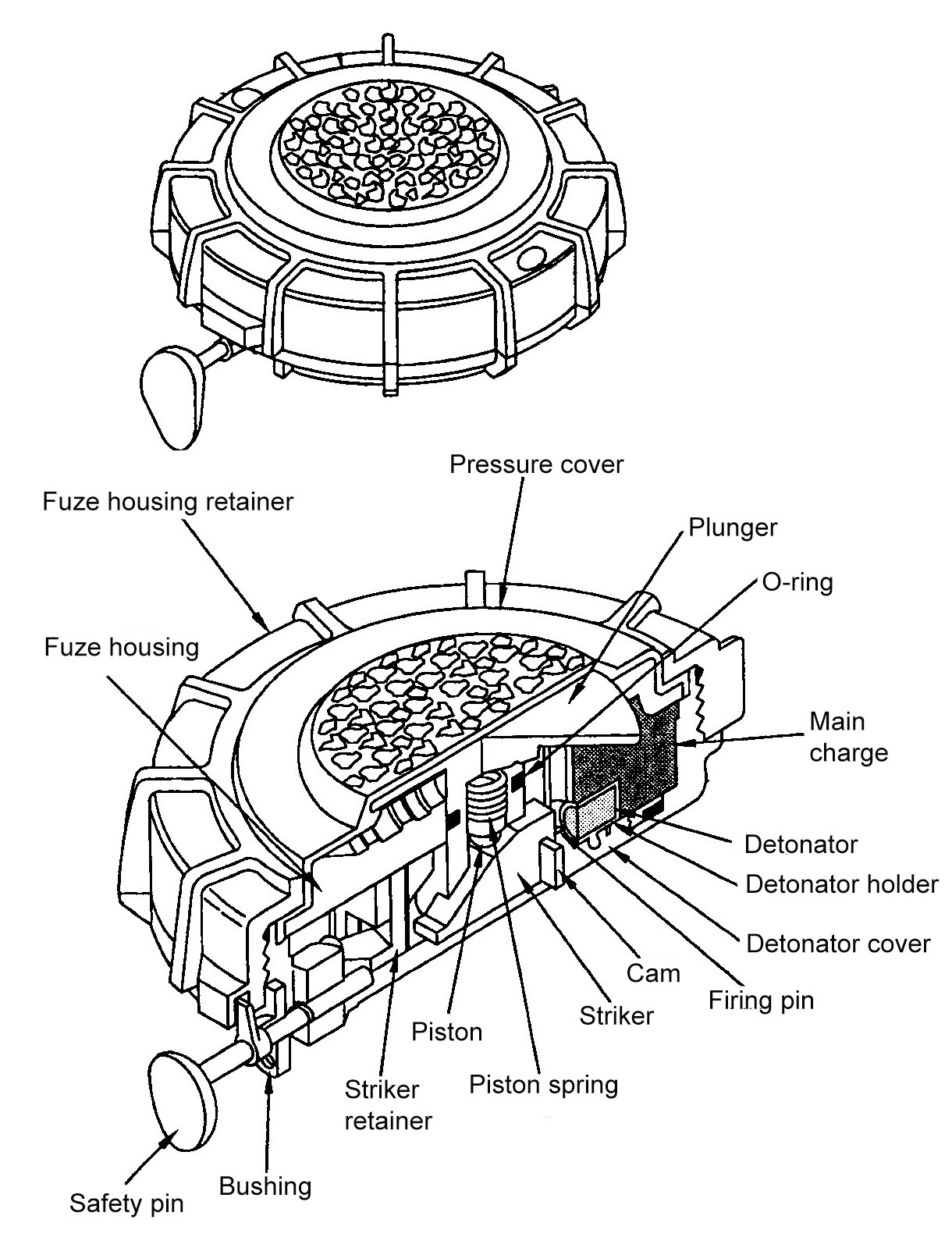
A cutaway of the VS-MK2 mine

The VS-MK-2 is a plastic bodied scatterable anti-personnel blast mine manufactured by the now-defunct Valsella Meccanotecnica, SpA, an Italian high-tech defence contractor that specialized in the development and production of area denial systems. The mine is extremely difficult to detect because of its low metal content i.e. it is a minimum metal mine. Additionally, it is resistant to blast overpressure due to a pneumatic system in the fuze. The mine will also function in up to 1 metre of water. An electrically fused anti-handling version of the mine was also produced designated VS-MK-2-EL, VS-MK-2-E or VS-MK2 AR-AN to hinder clearance attempts. Although Italy has ceased production of this mine it may still be found in uncleared minefields in Angola, Sudan and the Western Sahara.

== Description ==
The mine is circular and normally olive green or sand colored. The top of the mine has a black neoprene plunger/pressure plate, which rests on a small spring. The mine is internally divided into two sections separated by a small air bleed hole. When the plunger is compressed, air is forced through the bleed hole equalizing pressure in the upper and lower section. When the mine experiences sudden overpressure an air bladder inflates caused by the differential in pressure between the upper and lower sections, this prevents the activation of the mine. When constant pressure is applied the pressure equalizes gradually and the mine is activated, a firing pin is flipped sideways by the plunger into a stab-detonator, which fires the horseshoe-shaped main explosive charge.

The amount of explosive in a VS-Mk 2 mine is comparatively small in relation to other anti-personnel mines because it is designed to disable victims, not kill them. Although the blast wound from an VS-Mk 2 is unlikely to be fatal (assuming that prompt emergency medical care is provided) it usually destroys a significant part of the victim's foot, thereby leading to some form of permanent disability regarding their gait. However, in situations where the victims are barefoot or wearing sandals, the blast wounds are more severe.

== Specifications ==
- Weight: 135 g
- Explosive content: 33 g of RDX phlegmatized with paraffin wax.
- Diameter: 90 mm
- Height: 32 mm
- Operating pressure: 12 kg

== See also ==
- VS-50 mine
- TS-50 mine
- TC/6 mine
