= TS-50 mine =

Italian anti-personnel mine

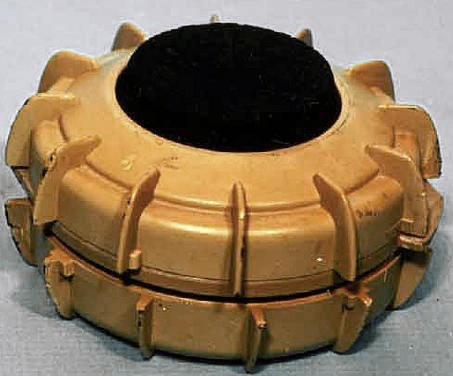
VS-50 mine which looks very similar to the TS-50. The primary visual difference is that the VS-50 usually features a black rubber pressure plate (TS-50's pressure plate is usually body coloured, and is stamped TS-50) but the key identifier is the horizontal indexing tabs off the vertical fins visible in the left and far right side of the mine in the picture.

The TS-50 is a 90 mm (3.5 in) diameter circular Italian blast resistant minimum metal anti-personnel mine designed and produced by Valsella Meccanotecnica (Italy).

== Description ==
The mine has a ribbed plastic case which is olive green, brown or sand colored. The mine has a central raised pressure pad on the top surface of the mine, but is designed to operate even with the mine upside down. Pressure on the mine forces air through a diaphragm into a small rubber air bag, which inflates. As the bag inflates it pushes a shutter, which in turn removes the striker retaining lug. The striker is free to impact the detonator. The mine requires a constant pressure of approximately 2 to 5 kg (5 to 11 lbs) for an average of 0.11 seconds before the fuze will detonate. This allows the mine to be laid in a high density pattern without the shock of a detonation impacting the nearby mines.

The design of the TS-50's fuze gives it a large degree of resistance to explosive overpressure clearance techniques, because the short sharp shock from an explosion does not last long enough to force enough air into the air bag to trigger the mine. This feature, combined with the use of non-magnetic metals used in the mine, make it difficult to clear using conventional techniques. A metal "detector" disc is provided with the mine to make it more detectable, however it is rarely used.

The mine is waterproof and can be used in shallow water. The mine can be either laid by hand or scattered by helicopter from a dispenser system.

== Production ==
The mine was originally produced by Tecnovar italiana SpA, and was in service with the Italian army. When the anti-personnel mine ban came into force the Italian army destroyed all its stocks of the mine. It is very similar to another Italian mine, the VS-50. TS-50 mines were widely exported and also were produced under licence in Egypt. Uncleared minefields containing TS-50 mines are located in Afghanistan, Azerbaijan, Ecuador, Georgia, Kurdistan, Kuwait, Iraq, Lebanon, Rwanda and the Western Sahara.

== Designations ==
- T/79 – Egyptian army designation for a locally produced version of the TS-50 mine. More than 1.2 million T/79s have been produced. Most T/79 landmines were assembled by Egyptian factories, using a combination of imported Italian parts and locally manufactured components.
- YM-1 – designation for an Iranian copy of the TS-50 mine.

== Specifications ==
- Diameter: 90mm
- Height: 45mm
- Weight: 185 grams
- Explosive content: 50 grams of Composition B
- Operating pressure: 12.5 kg

== See also ==
- VS-50 mine – (Italy)
- VS-MK2 mine – (Italy)
- TC/6 mine – (Italy)
