= Minimum-metal mine =

Landmine designed to avoid detection by conventional mine detection

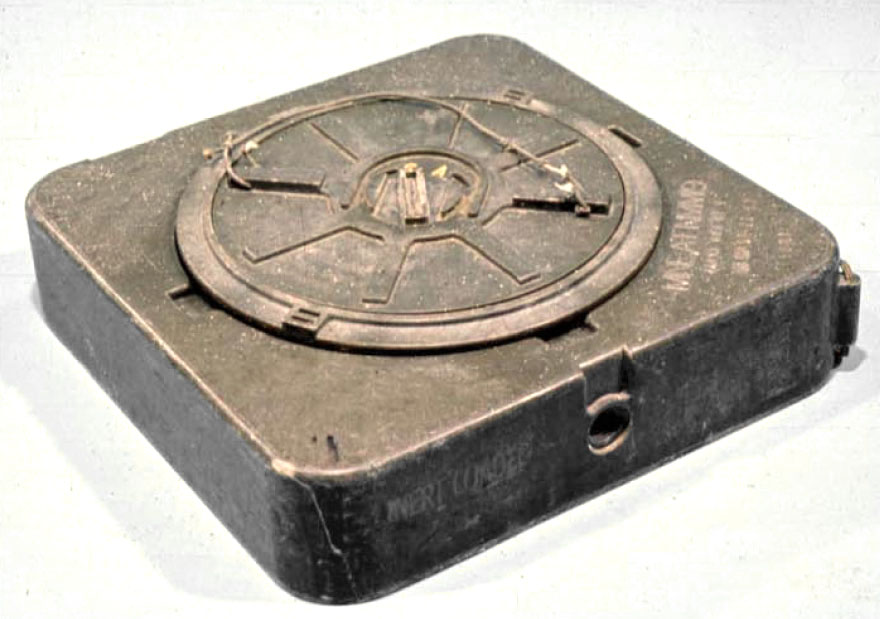
An inert US M19 anti-tank mine. This mine weighs 12.56 kilograms (27.7 lb), of which 2.86 grams (1/10 oz) is metal

A minimum-metal mine is a land mine that is designed to use the smallest amount of metal possible in its construction. Typically, the only metal components are located inside the fuze mechanism which triggers detonation. Both minimum-metal anti-tank and anti-personnel mines exist. Some designs contain virtually no metal at all, such as less than a gram.

== Methods ==
=== Low-metallic mines ===
This is achieved by encasing the explosive charge in a plastic, wooden, or glass body, with metallic components limited to the few small parts in the fuze which can not easily be made from other materials, such as the spring, striker tip, and shear pin. Minimum-metal mines are extremely difficult to detect using conventional metal mine detectors and usually require modern techniques, such as robotic multi-period sensing (MPS) equipment, to identify, but it is still extremely difficult to find non-metallic mines. These techniques are usually restricted to well-funded international mine clearing organizations and major militaries, making minimum-metal mines especially pernicious where they are encountered.

=== Non-metallic mines ===
Though rare, a few land mine designs (both anti-tank and anti-personnel) contain no metal whatsoever. Such mines cannot be found using metal detectors because there is no metal to detect. Typically, 100% non-metallic landmines have a plastic case and a fuze which comprises a glass or plastic vial containing a mixture of friction-sensitive pyrotechnic composition and glass powder. Downward force on the pressure plate overcomes the breaking strain of a plastic shear pin which snaps, allowing the non-metallic firing pin assembly to move. The firing pin is pushed down through a flexible plastic forcing-cone, which abruptly releases it on the other side at much higher velocity. Concentrated pressure is thereby transferred directly onto the glass vial, crushing and fracturing it. Alternatively, when the shear pin breaks, pressure on the fuze is transferred onto a plastic belleville spring which flips downwards, stabbing a non-metallic tapered pin (sometimes made from a glass ceramic) through a thin plastic membrane covering the vial of friction-sensitive pyrotechnic mixture. Either way, this action causes a flash of flame that triggers the detonator and initiates the adjacent booster which in turn detonates the main explosive filling.

== Examples ==
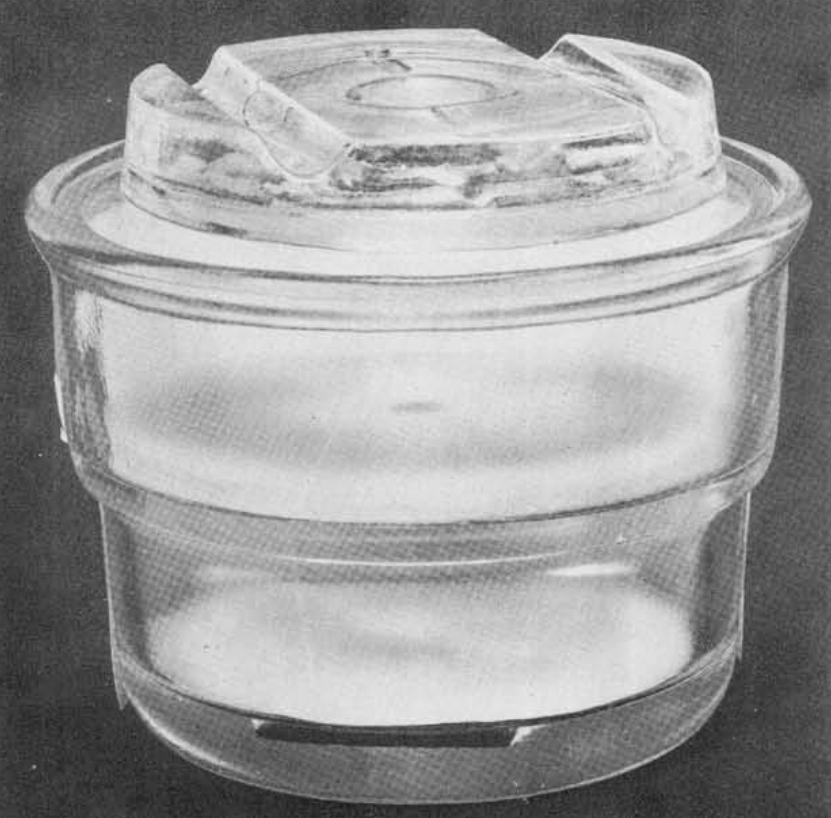
A Glasmine 43, a World War 2 anti-personnel mine made from glass. Catalogue of Enemy Ordnance Material, US Office of the Chief of Ordnance, 1945

Early examples included the German Glasmine 43, Schu-mine 42, and Topfmine used during World War II. These designs were either difficult or impossible to find using 1940s metal detectors.

Many different types of minimum-metal mines have been produced in various countries over the years. Relatively modern examples include the antitank mines M19 (United States, less than 3g of metal) and TMA-3 (Serbia, no metal) and the anti-personnel mines PRB M-409 (Belgium, less than 1g) and the PMA-2 or PMA-3 Serbia, (approx 1g non-magnetic) and VS-50 (Italy). Since the 1970s and until 1993 (when the country enacted a national landmines manufacturing ban, four years before signing the Ottawa Treaty) Italy became a world leader in the manufacture of minimum-metal mines; the three main Italian landmine manufacturers were mostly producing minimum-metal mines by the early 1980s. Valsella Meccanotecnica SpA manufactured the VS-50 and VS-Mk2. Misar SpA produced the SB-81 and SB-33, and Tecnovar Italiana SpA produced the TS-50, TC/3.6 and TC/6 mines.

== International law ==
Article 4 of the 1996 Amended Protocol II to the Convention on Certain Conventional Weapons provides that "It is prohibited to use anti-personnel mines which are not detectable, as specified in paragraph 2 of the Technical Annex."

== See also ==
- Anti-handling device
- Blast resistant mine
- List of land mines (provides extensive details of various designs)
