= SB-81 mine =

Italian anti-tank mine

The SB-81 is an Italian plastic cased minimum metal anti-tank blast mine dating from the early 1980s. The mine uses an air pressure based fuze, which gives it protection against overpressure and blast. It can therefore be regarded as a blast resistant mine. The mine can be scattered by hand or by mine laying systems.

The mine is found in the Falkland Islands and the Western Sahara. An electronically fuzed version of this mine (the SB-81/AR-AN) was also produced which featured an integral anti-handling device plus self-destruct capability.

== Specifications ==
- Weight: 3.3 kg
- Explosive content: 2.2 kg of (84% TNT, 15% RDX, 1% HMX)
- Diameter: 230 mm
- Height: 90 mm
- Operating pressure: 150 to 310 kg

== Variants ==
- YM-II - This is an Iranian copy of the mine, its specifications are slightly different from the SB-81 - it weighs 3.2 kg and has a main charge of 2 kg of Composition B. It is produced in olive green or sand coloured ABS plastic and is found in Afghanistan, Lebanon (by Hezbollah) and Iran.
- M/453 - A copy produced in Portugal. It is in service with the Portuguese armed services.
- Expal SB-81 - A copy produced in Spain.
