= Anti-personnel mine =

Form of land mine designed for use against humans

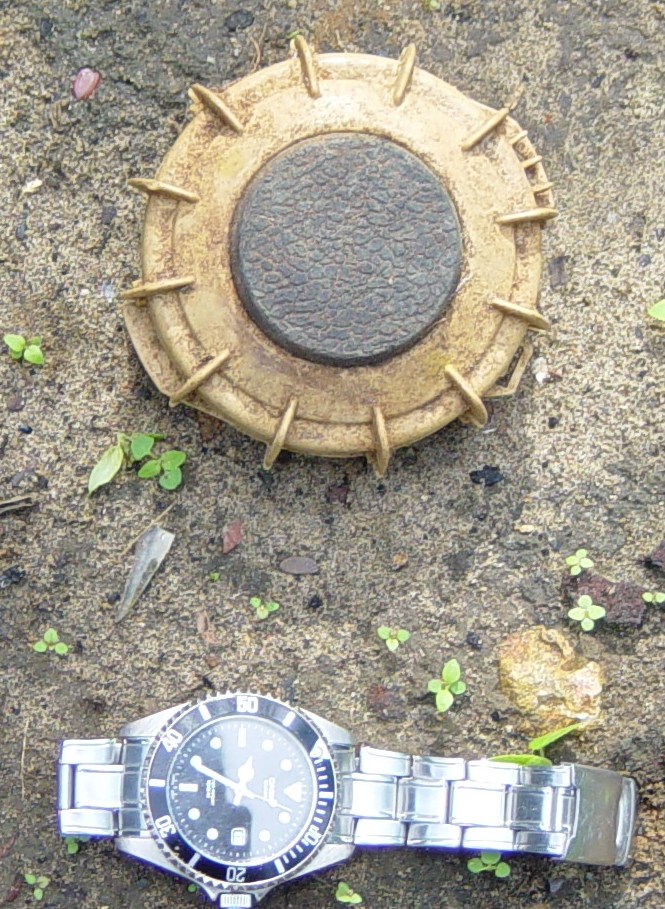
Sand-colored VS-50 mine intended for use in desert environments (shown beside a wristwatch, for scale)

An anti-personnel mine or anti-personnel landmine (APL or APERS) is a form of mine designed for use against humans, as opposed to an anti-tank mine, which target vehicles. APLs are classified into blast mines and fragmentation mines; the latter may or may not be a bounding mine.

APLs are often designed to injure and maim, not kill, their victims to overwhelm the logistical (mostly medical) support system of enemy forces that encounter them. Some types of APLs can also damage the tracks on armoured vehicles or the tires of wheeled vehicles.

The International Campaign to Ban Landmines has sought to ban mines and destroy stockpile. For this purpose, it introduced in 1997 the Ottawa Treaty, which has not yet been accepted by over 30 states and has not guaranteed the protection of citizens against APLs planted by non-state armed groups.

== Use ==
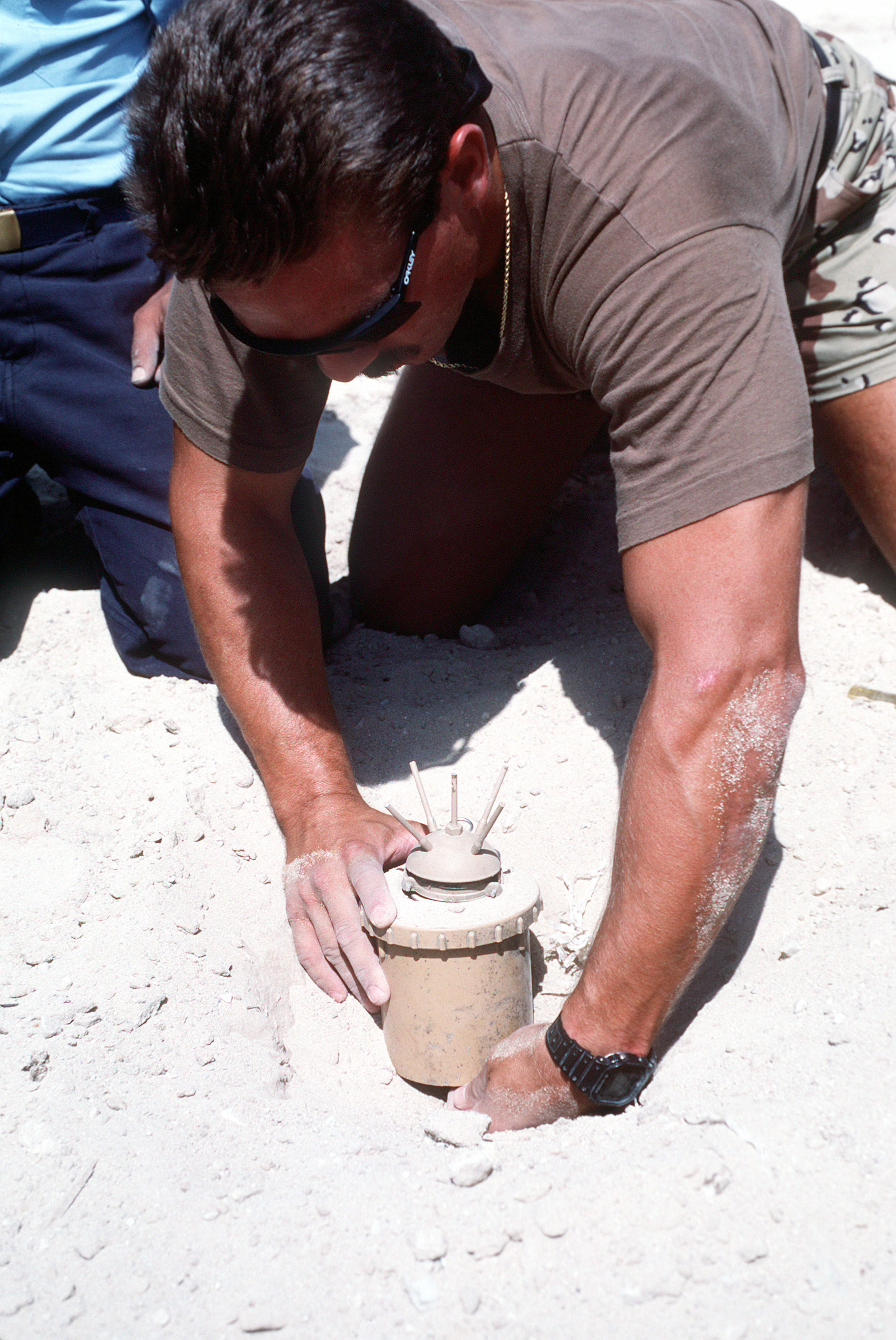
Soldier removing an Italian Valmara 69 anti-personnel bounding mine

Anti-personnel mines are used in a similar manner to anti-tank mines, in static "mine fields" along national borders or in defense of strategic positions as described in greater detail in the land mine article. What makes them different from most anti-tank mines, however, is their smaller size, which enables large numbers to be simultaneously deployed over a large area. This process can be done manually, via dispensers on land vehicles, or from helicopters or aircraft. Alternatively, they can be dispensed by cargo-carrying artillery shells.

Other uses specific to anti-personnel mines are where they are deployed on an ad hoc basis in the following situations:

- When laying an ambush
- Protecting a temporary base
- To force any attackers to travel through a narrow, cleared path where firepower can be focused on the enemy
- To evade pursuit (e.g. M86 pursuit deterrent munition)
- To protect equipment by employing the mines as booby traps
- To booby trap other mines as a form of anti-handling device

== Blast mines ==
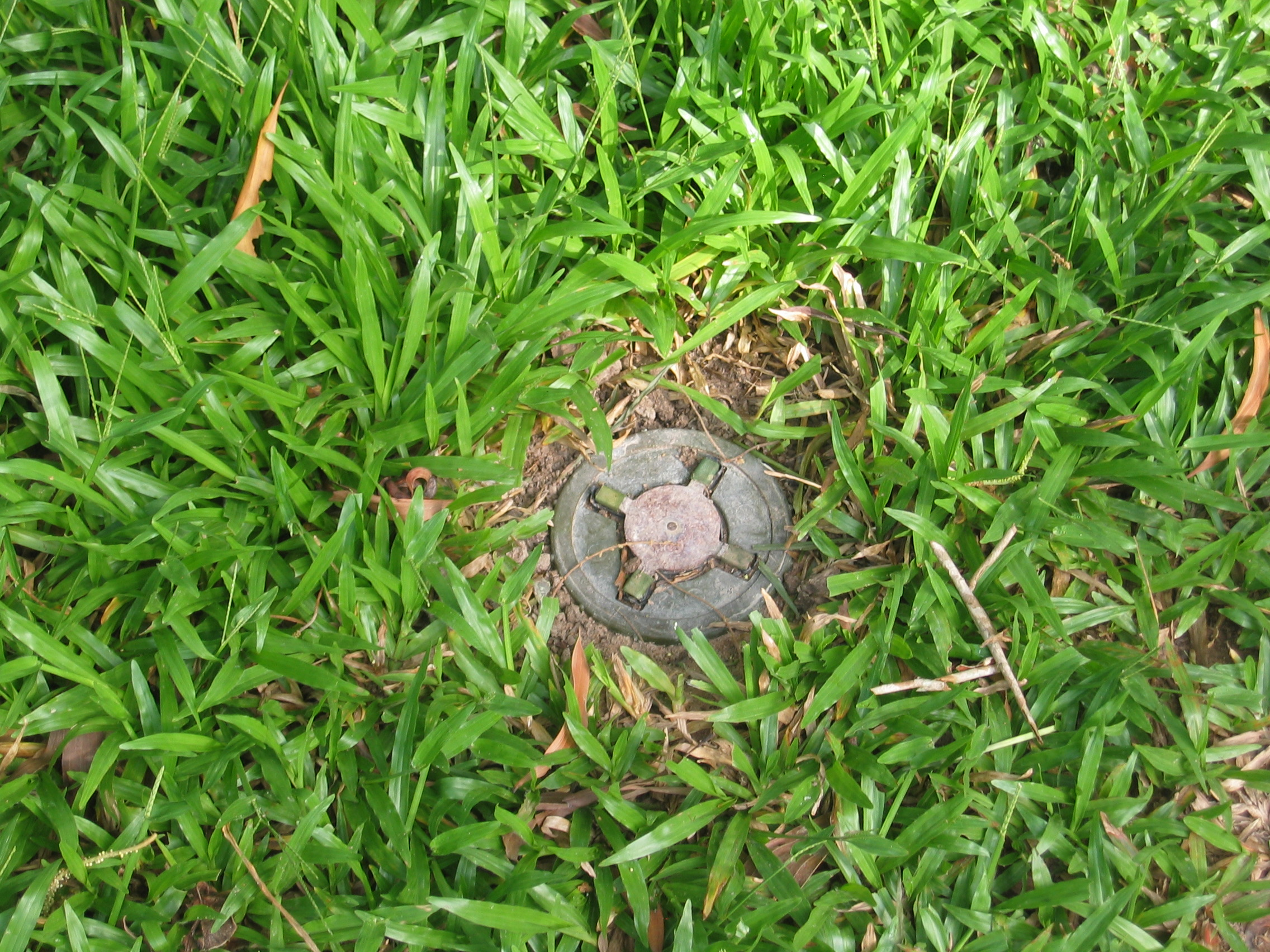
Anti-personnel mine in Cambodia

Typically, anti-personnel blast mines are triggered when the victim steps on them. Their primary purpose is to blow the victim's foot or leg off, disabling them. Injuring, rather than killing, the victim is viewed as preferable to increase the logistical (evacuation, medical) burden on the opposing force.

=== Effect ===
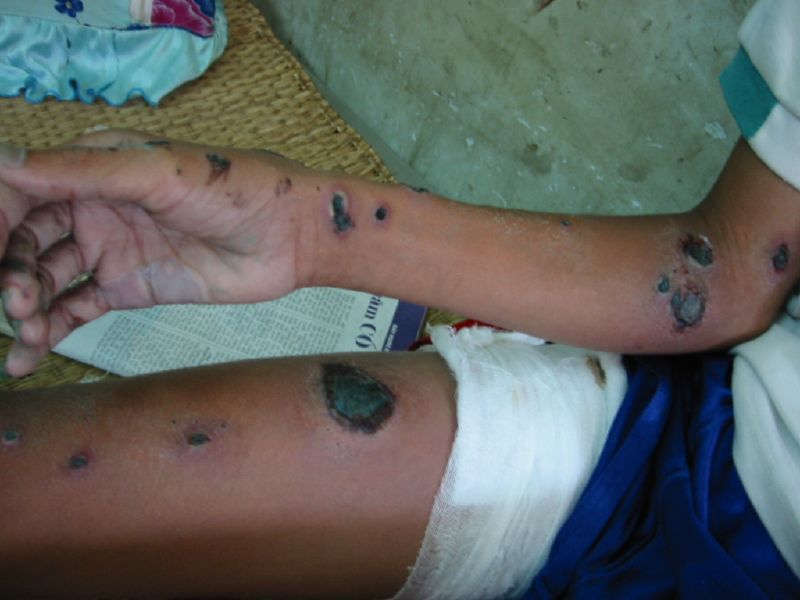
Vietnamese child shows injuries caused by a land mine explosion.

When a person steps on a blast mine and activates it, the mine's main charge detonates, creating a blast shock wave consisting of hot gases travelling at extremely high velocity. The shock wave sends a huge compressive force upwards, ejecting the mine casing and any soil covering the mine along with it. When the blast wave hits the surface, it quickly transfers the force into the subject's footwear and foot. This results in a massive compression force being applied. In most cases, the victim's foot is blown off by the blast wave.

The resulting injuries to a human body depend on the size of the mine's main charge, the depth, type of soil it was laid in and how the victim contacted it, e.g. stepping on the mine, using all or part of the foot. Different types of soil will result in different amounts of energy being transferred upward into the subject's foot, with saturated "clay-like" soil transferring the most. Larger main charges result in a release of significantly more energy, driving the blast wave further up a target's foot and leg and causing greater injury, in some cases even described as severe as traumatic amputation of the leg up to the knee.

Secondary injuries from a blast mine are often caused by the material that has been torn loose by the mine's explosion. This consists of the soil and stones that were on top of the mine, parts of the victim's footwear and the small bones in the victim's foot. This debris creates wounds typical of similar secondary blast effects or fragmentation. Special footwear, including combat boots or so-called "blast boots", is only moderately protective against the destructive effects of blast mines, and the loss of a foot is a typical outcome.

Blast mines have little effect on armoured vehicles, but can damage a wheeled vehicle if it runs directly over the mine. Small blast mines will severely damage a tire, rendering it irreparable while some types could also damage adjacent running gear.

=== Components ===
Typical components of an anti-personnel blast mine

==== Mine casing ====
The mine casing houses the components of the mine and protects it from its environment. Early mines, such as the ones used in the World War II era, had casings made of steel or aluminium. However, by the middle of the conflict, the British Army was using the first, practical, portable metal detector – the Polish mine detector. The Germans responded with mines that had a wooden or glass casing to make detection harder.

Wooden mines had been used by the Soviets in 1939, before the appearance of metal detectors, to save steel. Some, like the PP Mi-D mine, continued to be used into the 1980s as they were easy to make and hard to detect. Wood has the disadvantage of rotting and splitting, rendering the mine non-functional after a comparatively short time in the ground (or the advantage, in that the mine can be considered self-disabling, and will be less likely to cause unintended injuries years later).

Mines manufactured after the 1950s generally use plastic casings to hinder detection by electronic mine detectors. Some, referred to as minimum metal mines, are constructed with as little metal as possible – often around 1 gram (0.035 oz) – to make them difficult to detect. Mines containing absolutely no metal have been produced, but are uncommon. By its nature, a mine without any metal components in it cannot be found using a metal detector.

==== Pressure plate/fuze mechanism ====
The fuze mechanism is designed to set off the detonator, either by striking it with a spring-loaded firing pin, compressing a friction sensitive pyrotechnic composition, or by passing an electric charge through it. Most mines employ a spring-loaded striker that hits a stab detonator when activated by the victim. Typically, the detonator contains a tiny pellet of lead azide. The fuze is the most complicated component in any mine, although the amount of effort required to design and manufacture a simple fuze mechanism is quite low, similar to the retraction mechanism in a ballpoint pen. More sophisticated examples, such as the Italian SB-33 mine, have a fuze mechanism that detonates the mine if subject to gradual, steady pressure, but locks the fuze if subject to a sudden shock. This defeats one of the main methods of clearing a path through a minefield – detonating the mines with explosive devices, such as mine-clearing line charges.

==== Booster ====
The booster charge is a highly sensitive explosive that will activate easily when subjected to the shock of the detonator. Typically, a pea-sized pellet of RDX is used. The purpose of the booster is to amplify the shock of the detonator and initiate the main explosive charge.

==== Main charge ====
The main charge consists of a stable explosive that is detonated by the booster charge. This is necessary, because making a mine entirely out of a highly sensitive detonator or booster explosive would be more expensive, and make the device more sensitive and thereby susceptible to accidental detonation. In most AP blast mines TNT, Composition B or phlegmatized RDX are used. On a US M14 mine, 29 grams of tetryl is used, while 240 grams of TNT is used in a Russian PMN mine.

=== Deployment ===
Anti-personnel blast mines are the most common type and are typically deployed on the surface (hidden by leaves or rocks) or buried under soil at a depth of 10–15 cm. They are activated by pressure, i.e. when the victim steps on them, but it could also be a vehicle driving over them.

They were designed for use as area denial weapons. Weapons of this type are supposed to deny opposing military forces access to a specific area.

== Fragmentation mines ==
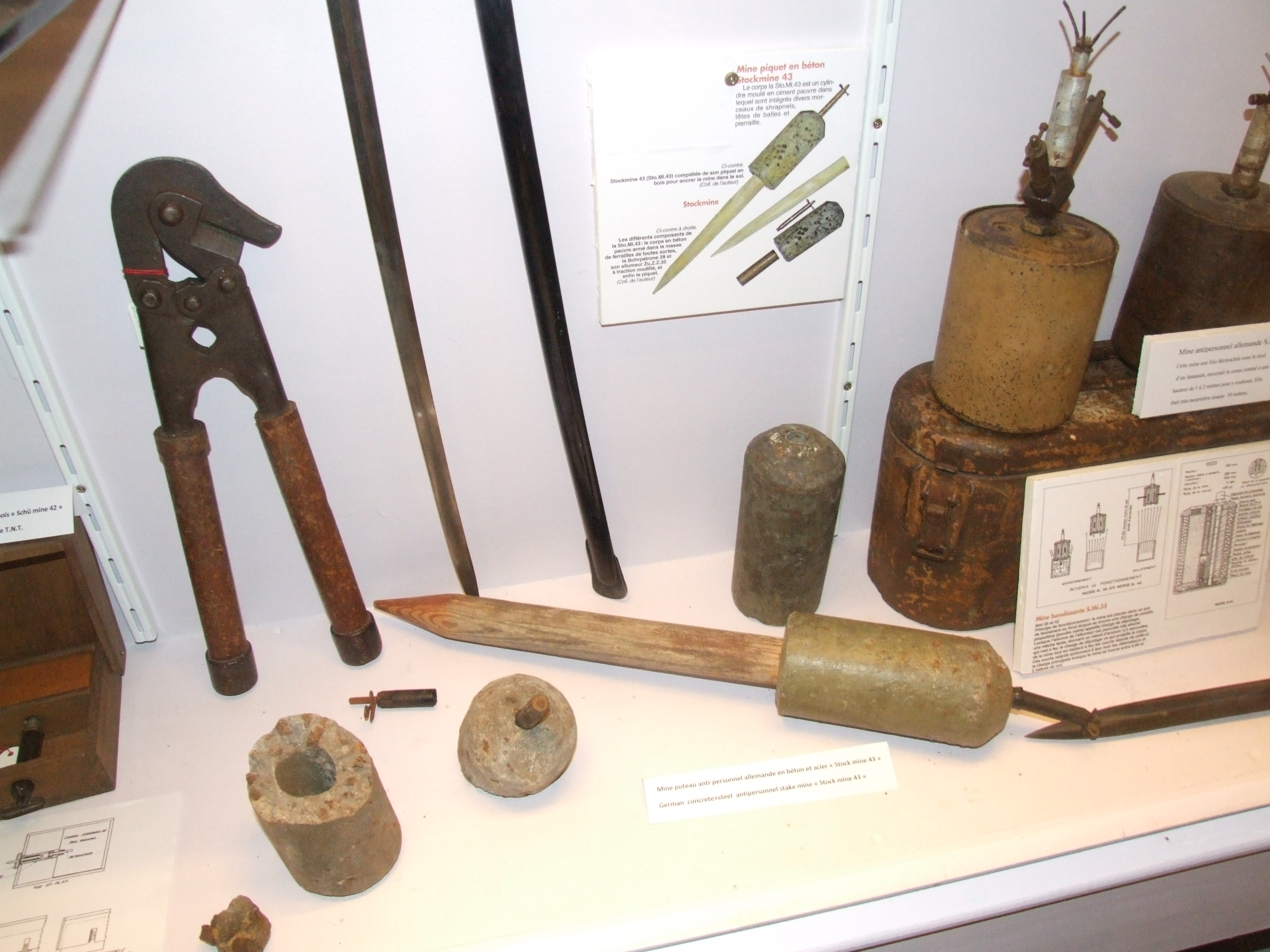
German Sto.Mi.43 stake mine (center) and S.Mi.35 bounding mines (upper right) on display at the Dunkirk Memorial Museum

While blast mines are designed to cause severe injury to one person, fragmentation mines (such as the World War II era German S-mine) are designed to project fragments across a wide area, causing fragmentation wounds to nearby personnel.

Fragmentation mines are generally much larger and heavier than blast mines, and contain a large amount (often several kilograms) of ferrous metal. As such, they are easy to detect if the environment is not too heavily contaminated with iron.

=== Effect ===
These mines are deemed to be more efficient than purely "blast effect" mines, because the shrapnel covers a greater area, potentially injuring more combatants.

The shrapnel from these mines can even disable some armoured vehicles, by puncturing their tires and—in the case of soft-skinned vehicles—also penetrating the skin and damaging internal components or injuring personnel. Because fragmentation mines generally contain a much larger charge than blast mines, they can cause severe damage to an unarmoured vehicle which runs directly over one.

=== Types of fragmentation mine ===
==== Stake ====
These mines (such as the Russian POMZ) are entirely above ground, having a fragmenting warhead mounted on a stake at a suitable height, concealed by vegetation or rubbish and triggered by one or more tripwires.

==== Bounding ====
Bounding mines have a small lifting charge that, when activated, launches the main body of the mine out of the ground before it detonates at around chest height. This produces a more lethal spray of shrapnel over a larger area. One such mine – the US M16 mine – can cause injuries up to 200 metres (660 ft) away. The steel shrapnel makes bounding mines easy to detect, so they may be surrounded by minimum metal mines to make mine clearance harder. The shrapnel is around 3-10mm in size.

==== Directional ====
Directional fragmentation weapons (such as the M18 Claymore) differ from other types in that they are designed to direct their fragments only in a limited arc. They are placed so that the blast will be directed at the target area and away from friendly forces. This design also allows forces to protect themselves by placing these types of mines near their own positions, but facing the enemy. They are triggered in a conventional manner with either tripwire or command detonation. They are generally referred to as claymore mines from the US mine of this type.

== Gallery ==
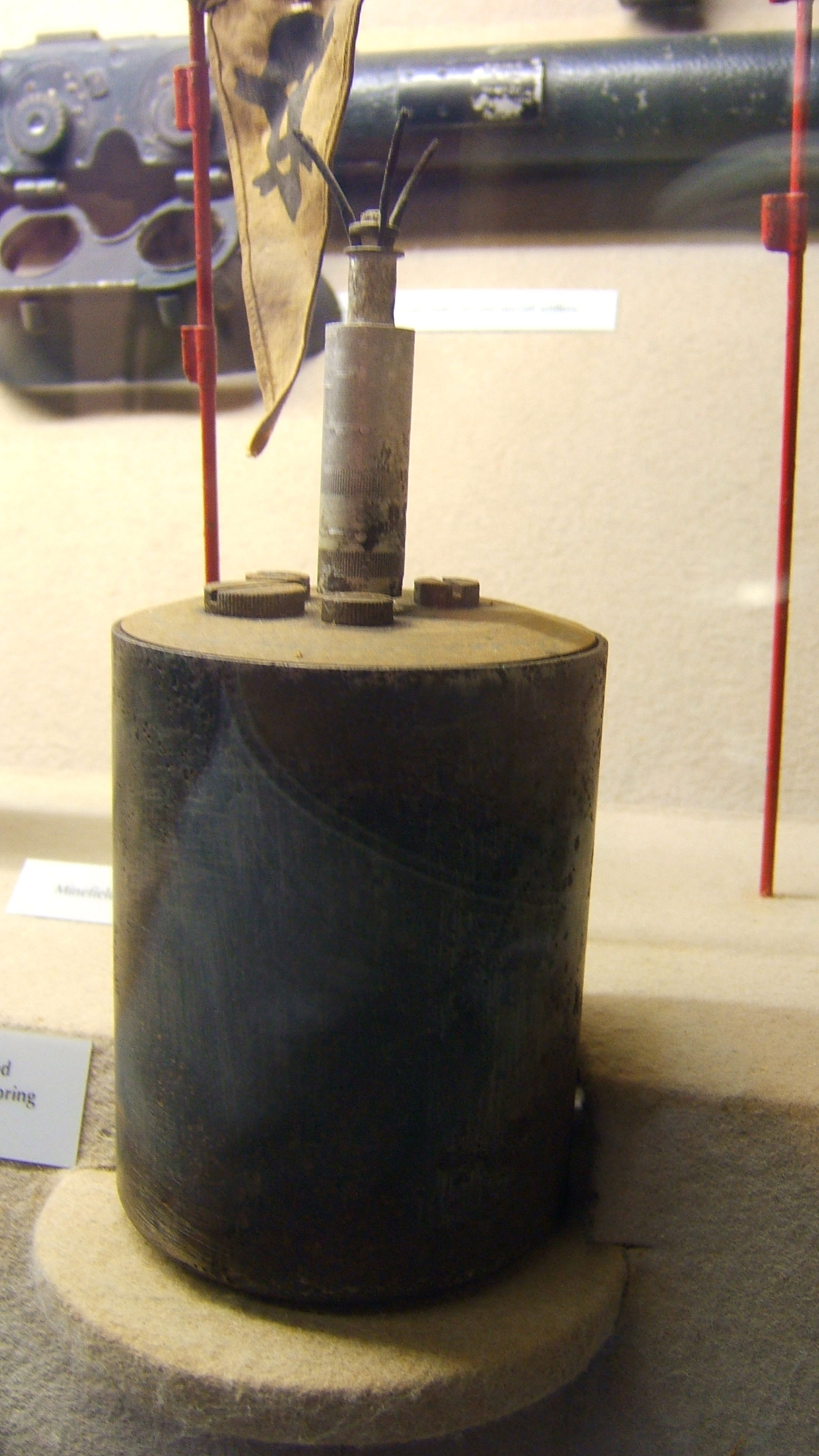
Bounding mine - German S-Mine

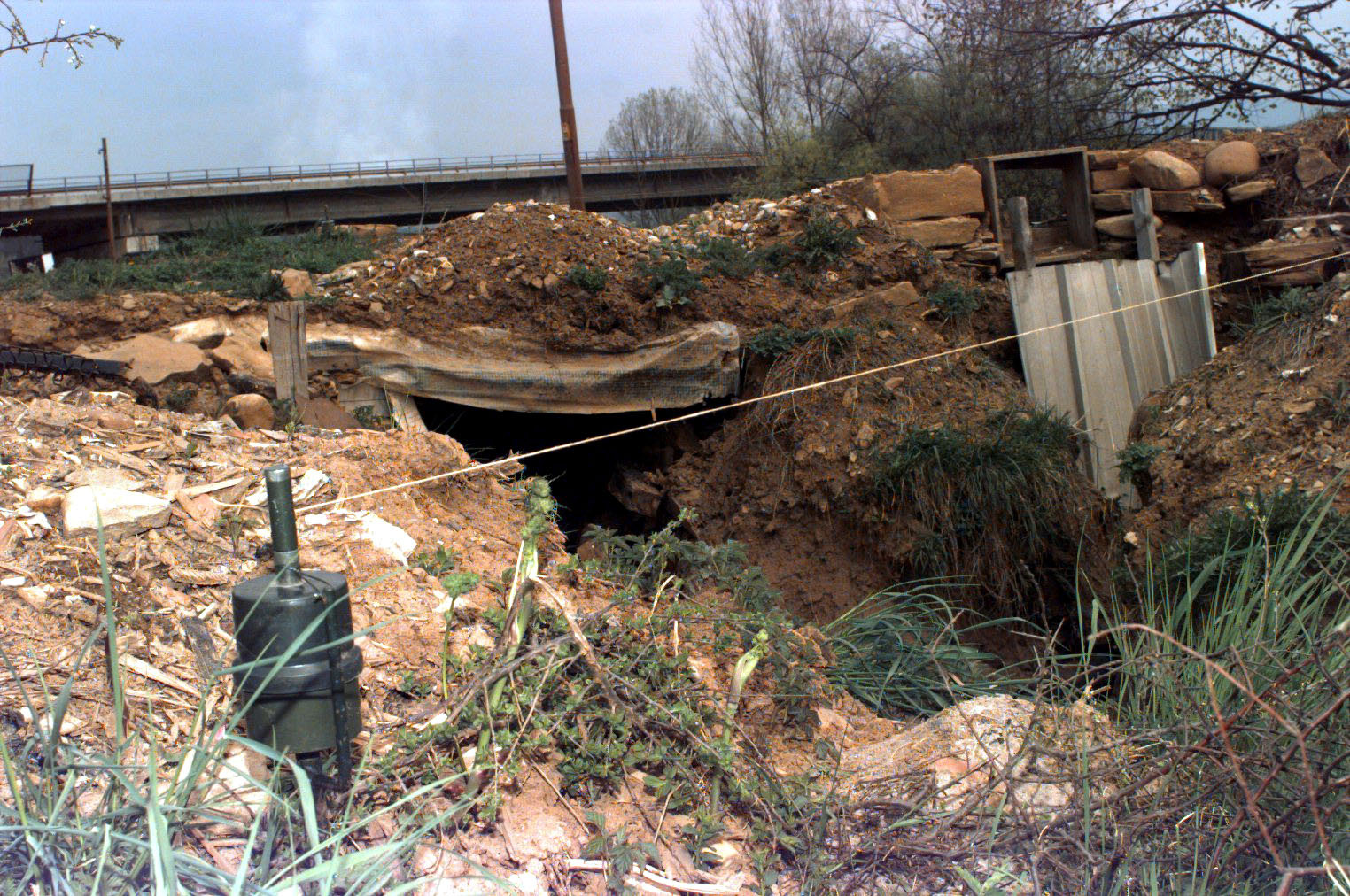
Stake mine - a Yugoslav IMP mine with tripwire (Balkans 1996)

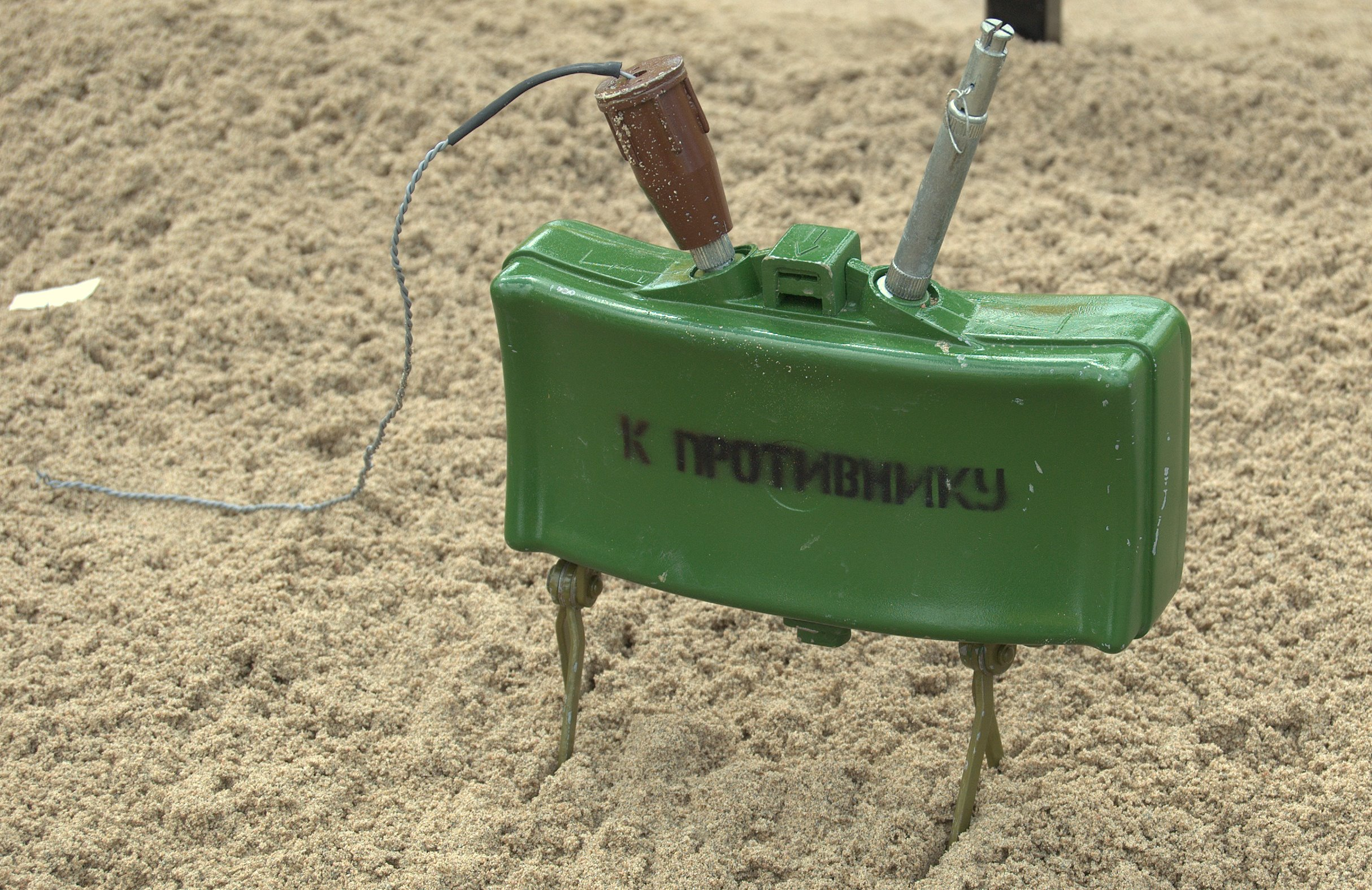
Directional mine - Russian MON-50

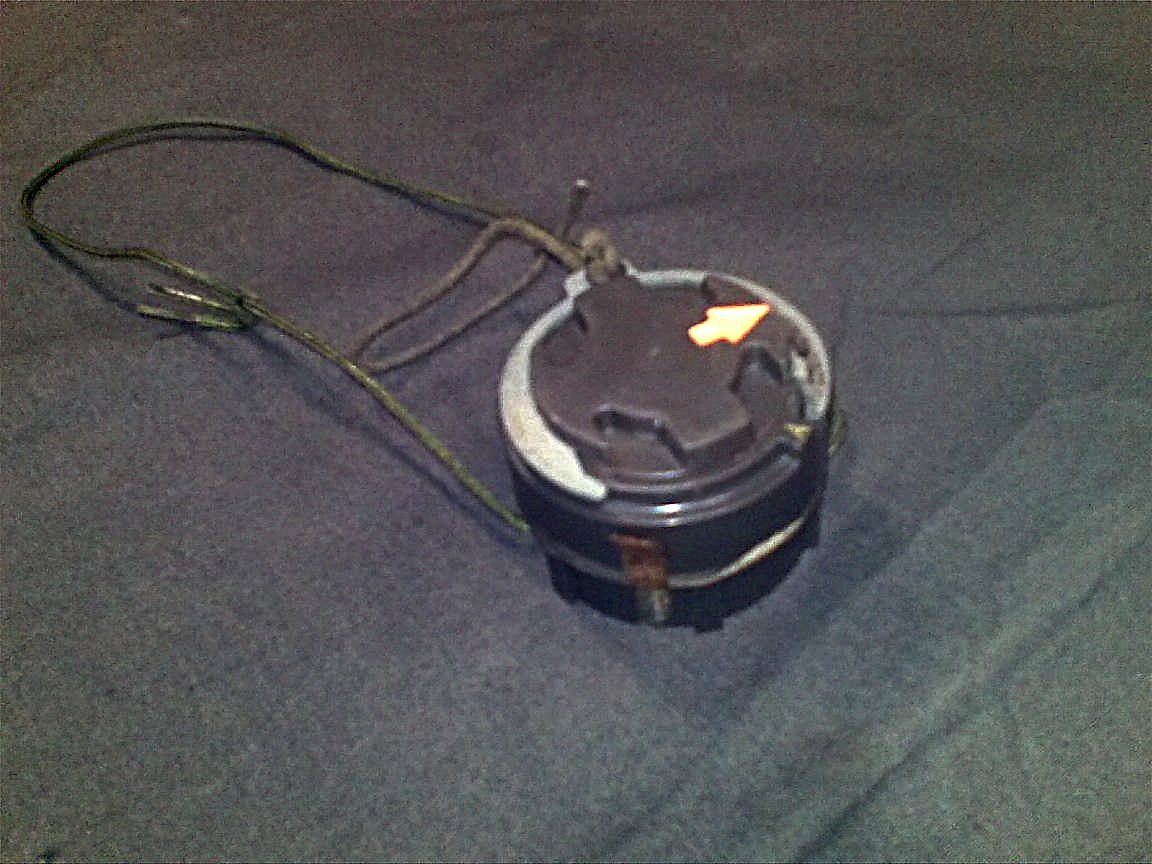
Blast mine - American M14

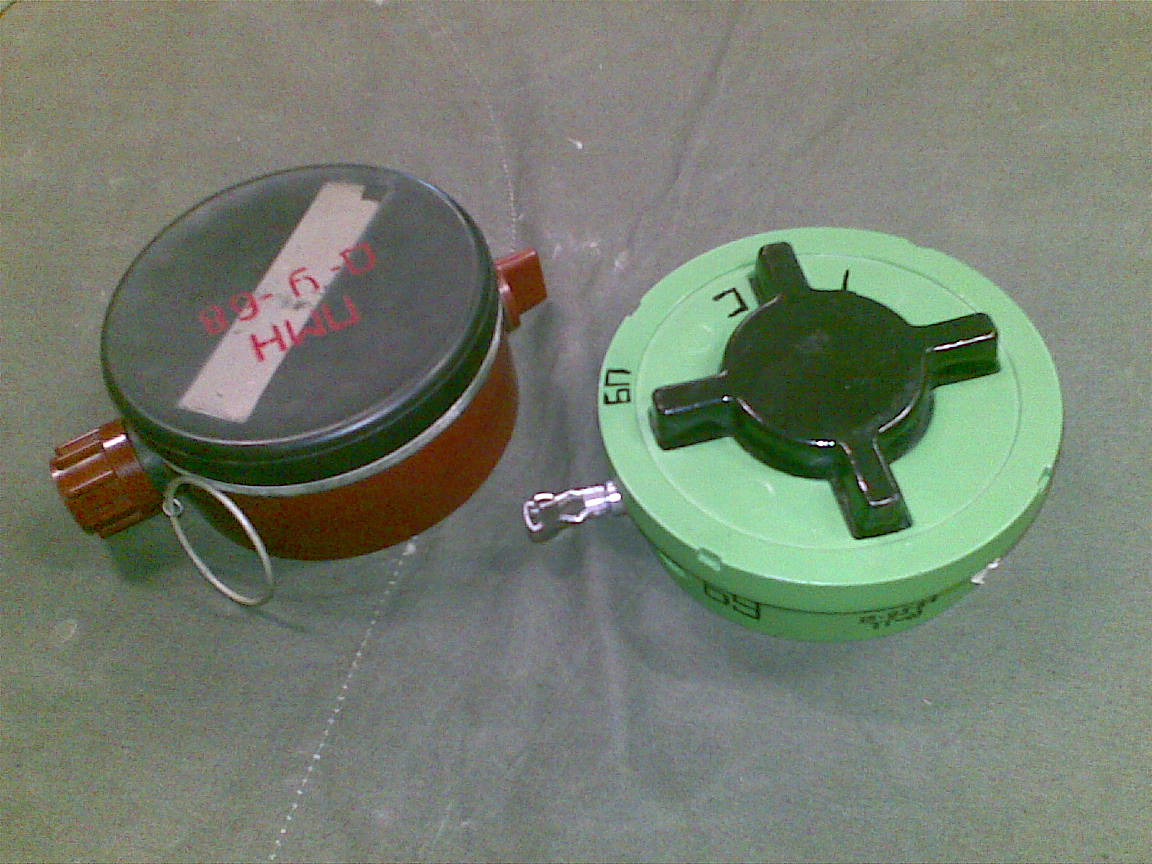
Blast mines - Russian PMN1 and PMN2

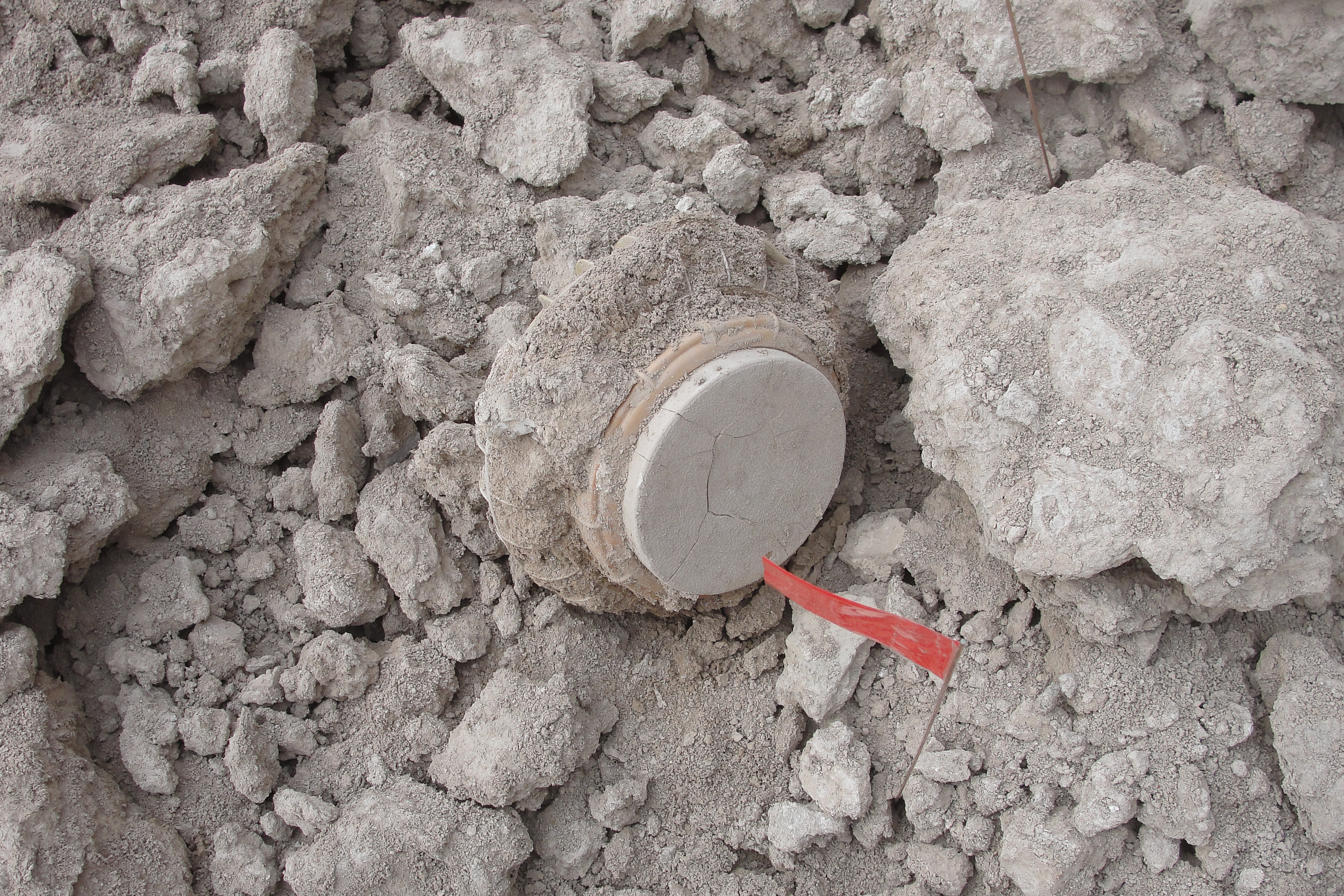
Blast mine - Italian TS-50 in-situ

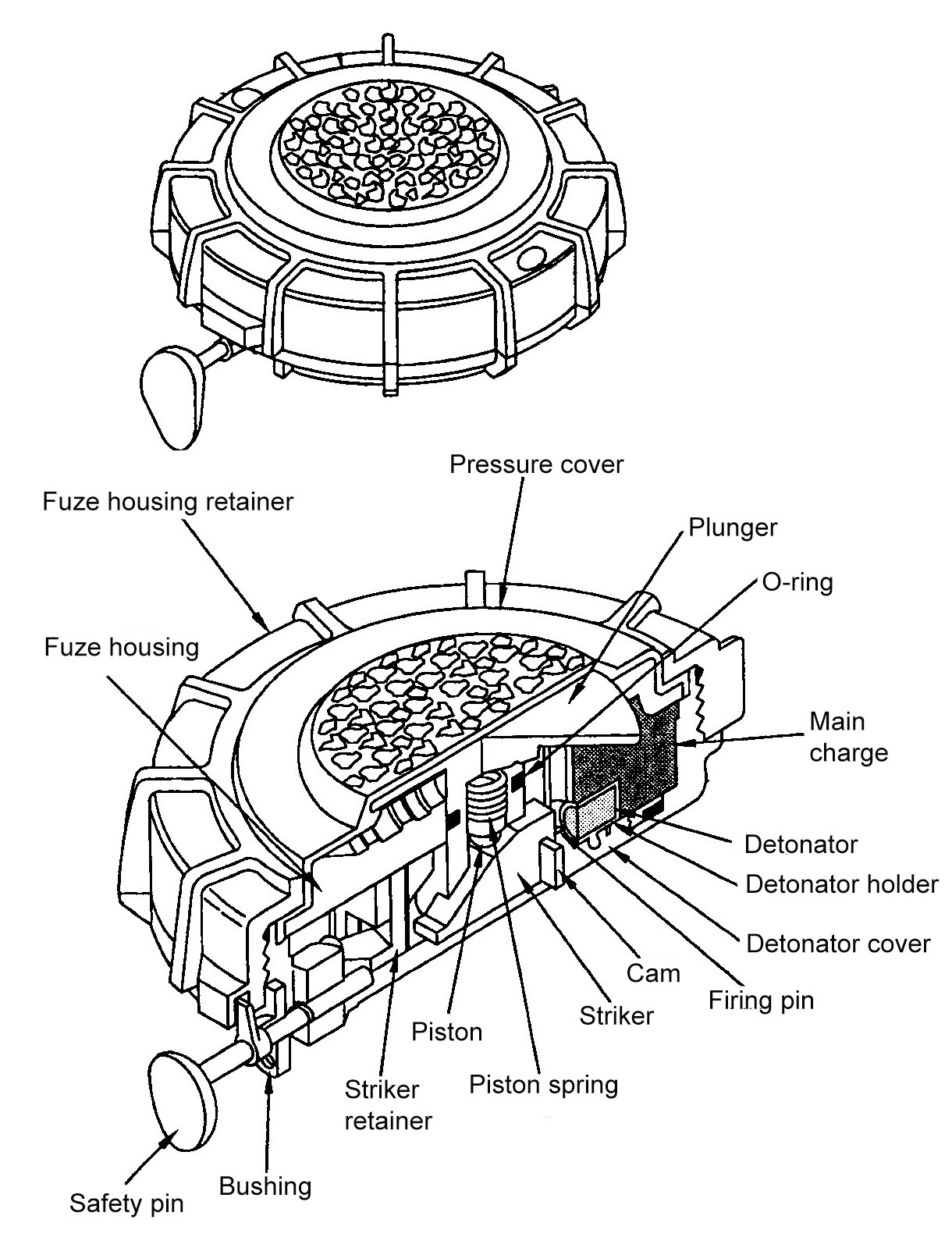
Blast mine - Italian VS-MK2 (cross-sectional view)

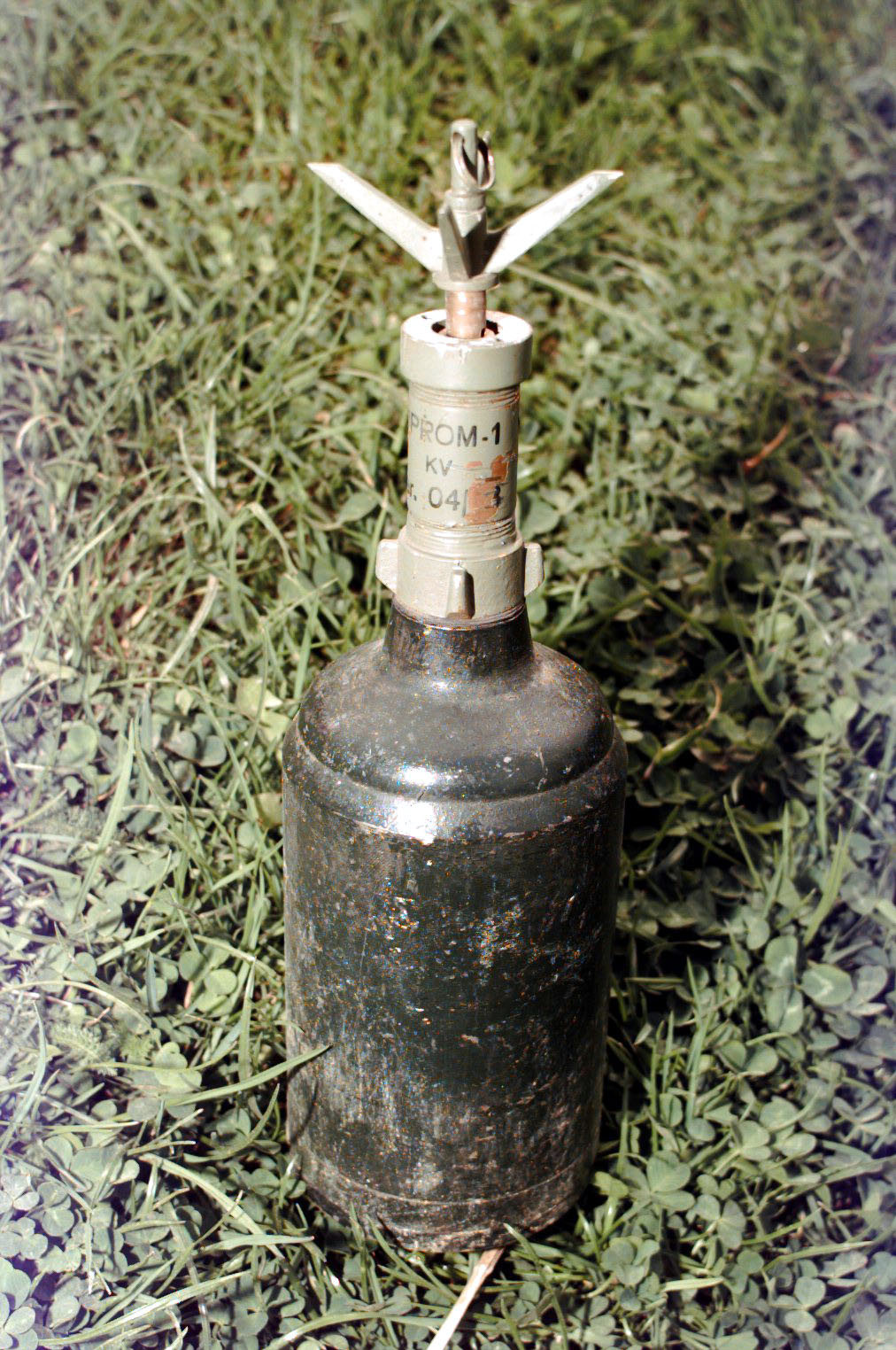
Bounding mine - Yugoslavian PROM-1

== Improvised explosive devices ==
In the conflicts of the 21st century, anti-personnel improvised explosive devices (IED) have replaced conventional or military landmines as the source of injury to dismounted (pedestrian) soldiers and civilians. These injuries were recently reported in BMJ Open to be far worse than landmines, resulting in multiple limb amputations and lower body mutilation. This combination of injuries has been given the name "Dismounted Complex Blast Injury" and is thought to be the worst survivable injury ever seen in war.

== Other mine types ==
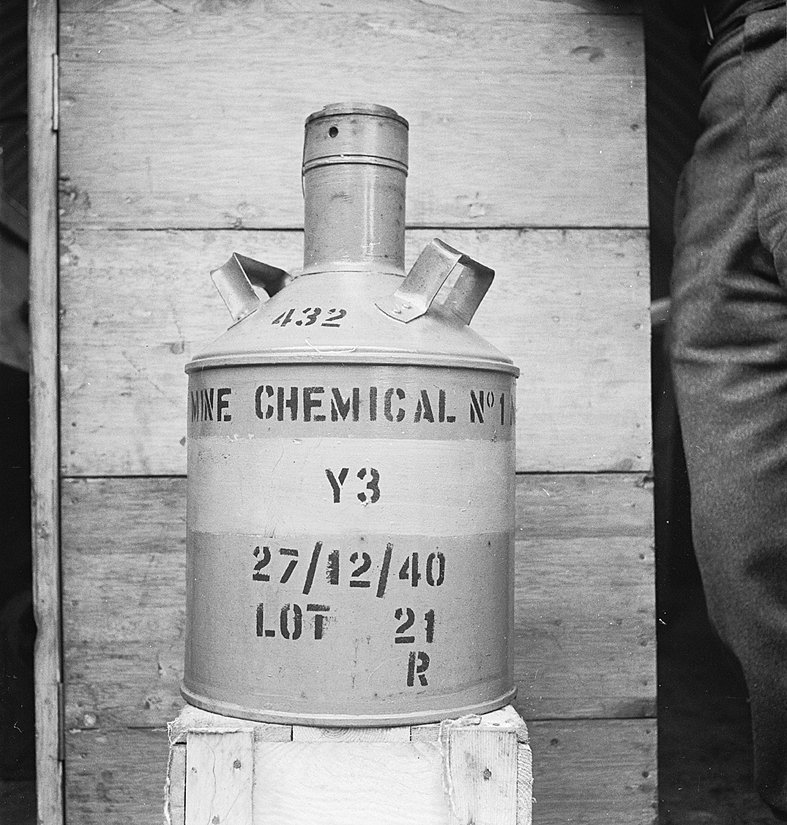
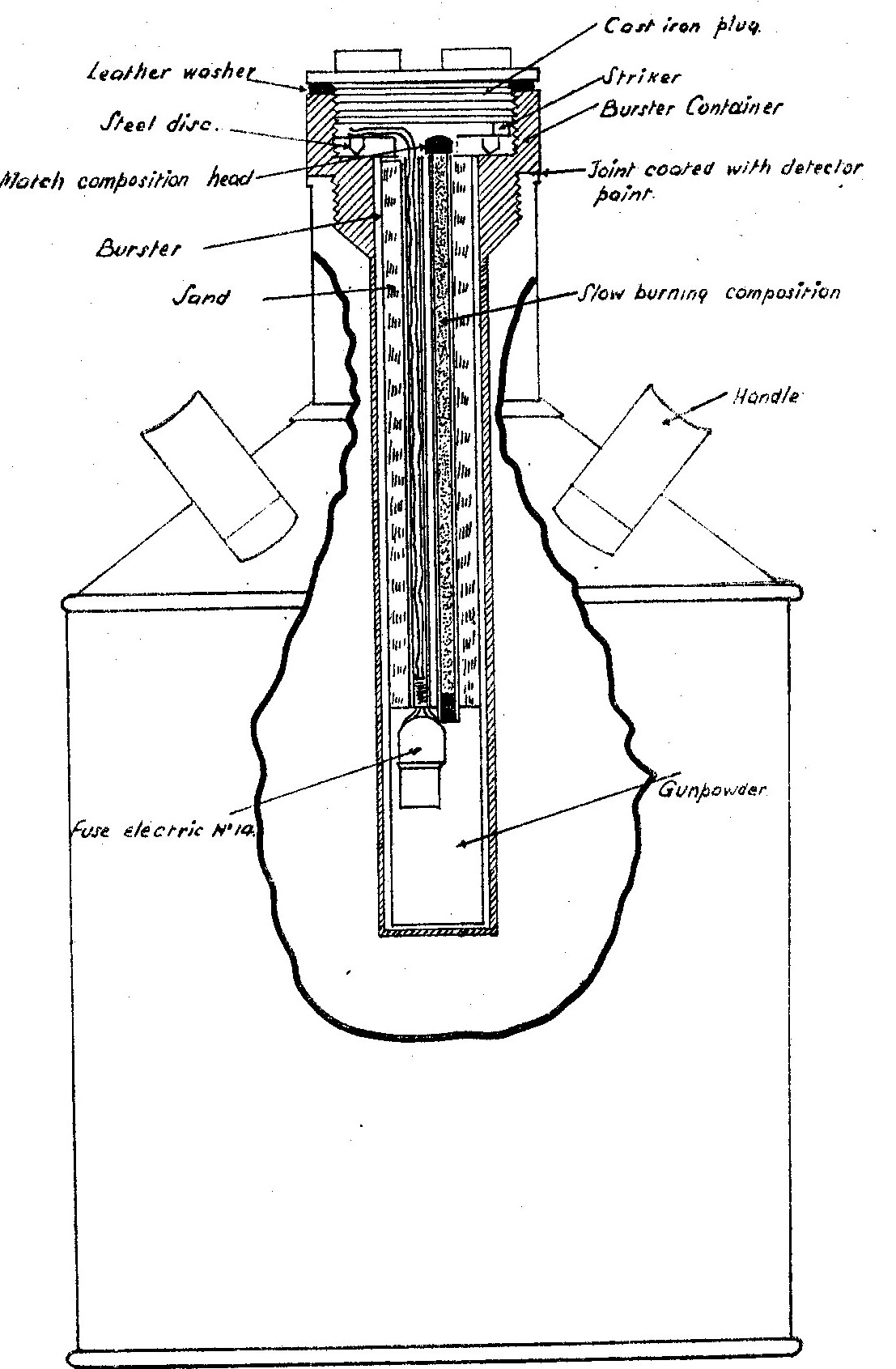
British chemical mine c1940: Chemical Mine No 1 Mk 1

During World War II, flame mines known as the flame fougasse were produced by the British during the invasion crisis of 1940. Later, the Soviets produced a flame-mine, called the FOG-1. This was copied by the Germans to produce the Abwehrflammenwerfer 42, these devices were effectively disposable, trip-wire triggered flamethrowers.

Chemical mines have also been made. They were made by Britain, the US and the Soviet Union during World War II, but never deployed. During the Cold War, the US produced the M23 chemical mine containing VX. A small explosive charge burst the mine open and dispersed the chemical when the mine was triggered.

== Examples ==
World War II anti-personnel mines

- S-mine (Bouncing Betty): infamous German bounding mine; widely copied after the war.
- Glasmine 43: German mine made largely from glass, to make it difficult to detect.
- PDM-6 and PMD-7: Soviet World War II mines, made from wood.

Post-War, US anti-personnel mines

- Gravel mine, 1960s–1970s. Simple, small mine with no moving parts. Millions were dropped during the Vietnam War.
- M16: improved version of the German S-mine.
- BLU-43 (Dragontooth), 1970s. Air-dropped mine used during the Vietnam War.
- GATOR mine system: modern dispersal system, includes AP (BLU-92/B) and anti-tank mines.
- M18 Claymore: directional mine.
- M86 pursuit deterrent munition: tripwire triggered bounding mine that automatically deploys its own tripwires. It is intended to be dropped by special forces when evading a pursuing enemy.

Post-War, Russian anti-personnel mines

- PFM-1 (butterfly mine, NATO: Blue Parrot), modern.
- POMZ: tripwire triggered, stake-mine.
- POM-3: scattered, sensor-triggered fragmentation mine
- MON-50: Russian directional mine; similar to the American M18 Claymore.
- PMN mine: one of the most commonly encountered mines during de-mining operations.
- MON-200: large mine with a 12 kg TNT charge. Also effective against light vehicles.

Post-War, British anti-personnel mines

- HB 876 mine: 1970s–1999. An air dropped mine used as part of the JP233 runway attacking system. Each attack with a JP233 also dropped 215 HB 876s that were intended to make repair of the damaged runway slow and dangerous.

Yugoslav anti-personnel mines

- MRUD: Directional mine similar to the M18 Claymore.

== Patentability ==
Anti-personnel mines are a typical example of subject-matter excluded from patentability under the European Patent Convention, because the publication or exploitation of such inventions are contrary to the "ordre public" and/or morality (Article 53(a) EPC).

== See also ==
- Anti-tank mine
- Blast resistant mine
- Anti-handling device
- Bounding mine
- Demining
- Fougasse (weapon)
- Handicap International
- Mine clearance agencies
- Mines Advisory Group
- Convention on the Prohibition of the Use, Stockpiling, Production and Transfer of Anti-Personnel Mines and on their Destruction also known as the Ottawa Treaty
- Swiss Foundation for Mine Action (FSD)
