= TC/3.6 and TC/6 mines =

Explosive device

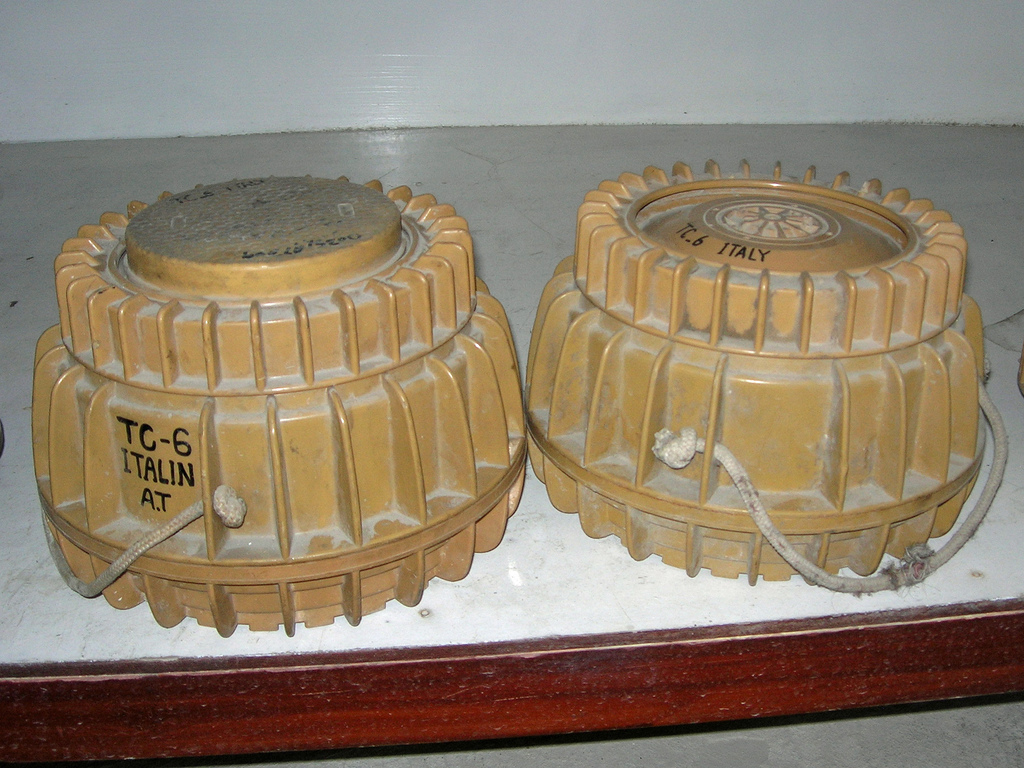
TC/6 Anti-Tank Mine

The TC/3.6 and TC/6 are round minimum metal Italian anti-tank blast mines. Both mines use the same fuzing system. They have round deep ribbed plastic cases that are either sand colored or olive green. The fuze works on an air pressure system, with the top pressure plate forcing air through a small bleed valve. The air then inflates a diaphragm which indirectly applies force to the striker spring until a steel restraining ball is forced out of the way of the striker. The striker is then flipped into the detonator, triggering the mine.

The air pressure fuze is designed to be resistant to shock and overpressure mine clearance techniques. It can therefore be regarded as a blast resistant mine. The mine was produced by the now-defunct Italian company, Tecnovar Italiana SpA, but is now no longer in production. In the 1970s a small number of the TC/6 version were produced in Portugal for testing and demonstration purposes only. No further production occurred. TC/6 Electronic versions of the mine were produced, the TCE/3.6, TCE/6. The TC/3.6 mine is found in Afghanistan, and the TC/6 is found in Afghanistan, Chad, Ecuador, and Tajikistan. Additionally, SAT electronic fuzes (which can have anti-handling device capability) may be used with these mines.

A copy of this mine is produced in Egypt.

== Specifications ==
	TC/3.6	TC/6
Weight	6.8 kg	9.6 kg
Explosive content	3.6 kg of Composition B	6 kg of Composition B
Diameter	270 mm	
Height	145 mm	185 mm
Operating pressure	180 to 310 kg	
