= Belleville =

Belleville (French, literally "beautiful town"; pronounced [bɛlvil]) may refer to:

== Places ==
=== Canada ===
- Belleville, New Brunswick, an unincorporated community in Wakefield Parish
- Belleville, Nova Scotia
- Belleville, Ontario

=== France ===
- Belleville, Deux-Sèvres, in the Deux-Sèvres département
- Belleville, Meurthe-et-Moselle, in the Meurthe-et-Moselle département
- Belleville, Paris is a neighbourhood of Paris, previously the center of an independent commune annexed by the City of Paris in 1860
  - Belleville (commune), that independent commune
  - Belleville station (Paris Metro), metro station named for commune
- Belleville, Rhône, in the Rhône département
- Belleville-en-Caux, in the Seine-Maritime département
- Belleville-et-Châtillon-sur-Bar, in the Ardennes département
- Belleville-sur-Loire, in the Cher département
- Belleville-sur-Mer, in the Seine-Maritime département
- Belleville-sur-Meuse, in the Meuse département
- Belleville-sur-Vie, in the Vendée département
- Saint-Martin-de-Belleville, in the Savoie département

=== United States ===
- Belleville, Arkansas
- Belleville, California
- Belle Ville, a settlement of Black Americans established in McIntosh County, Georgia during the Reconstruction Era
- Belleville, Illinois, the largest US city named Belleville
  - Belleville (St. Louis MetroLink)
  - Roman Catholic Diocese of Belleville
- Belleville, Indiana
- Belleville, Kansas
- Belleville, Michigan
- Belleville, Missouri
- Belleville, Nevada
- Belleville, New Jersey
- Belleville, New York
- Belleville, Pennsylvania
- Belleville, Tennessee
- Belleville, Virginia
- Belleville, West Virginia
- Belleville, Wisconsin

== Places elsewhere in the world ==
- Belleville, Galway, a community in Galway East, Ireland
- Belleville, Bouaké, neighbourhood of Bouaké, Ivory Coast
- Belleville, Sassandra-Marahoué, village in Ivory Coast

== Other uses ==
- Frederic De Belleville, Belgian-American actor
- Belleville boiler, a British water-tube boiler, modelled after a French design by Julien Belleville
- Belleville, a fictional city in the French animated movie The Triplets of Belleville
  - "Belleville Rendez-vous" (song), a song in the movie
- Belleville, a fictional town in the Andrew Lloyd Webber musical Cinderella
- Belleville washer, a type of spring
- Belleville (2011), a Drama Desk Award nominated play by Amy Herzog

== See also ==
- Bella Villa, Missouri
- Bellville (disambiguation)
- Belville (disambiguation)
