= M6 mine =

United States anti-tank landmine

The M6, M6A1 and M6A2 are a series of metal-cased, circular, heavy anti-tank landmines produced by the United States from May 1944 to May 1945.

Work on the M6 mine began in 1943, after the campaigns in North Africa. Testing had revealed the smaller M1 mine, filled with 2.70 kilograms (6.0 lb) of TNT, had difficulties breaking the tracks of heavy tanks such as the Tiger I, and it was desired that in addition to correcting technical defects with the M1, a heavy mine similar to the German Teller mine (with 5.5 kilograms (12 lb) of explosives) be available to American forces. After correction of defects in the T6E1, contracts were issued before the mine was standardized, and it began production in May 1944. The T6E1 was standardized as the M6 in September 1944. Because of a lessening need for antitank mines as the Allies went on the offensive in 1944, the T6E1/M6 was not deployed to the European theater. They were superseded in service after WWII by the larger M15 mine.

The mine is normally painted olive green and has a large central pressure plate. In the center of the pressure plate is an arming plug that has an arming lever with three settings: ARMED, DANGER and SAFE. The pressure plate rests on a concertina-like structure, which when enough force is applied is compressed. Compression results in a transfer plate under the arming plug pressing downwards onto a belleville spring which inverts, flipping the firing pin into the detonator, which triggers the adjacent explosive booster and main explosive charge.

The mine is fitted with two secondary fuze wells on the side and bottom to enable anti-handling devices to be fitted. The M6 and M6A1 variants were fitted with chemical fuzes, the M600 and M601, the later M6A2 used the mechanical M603 fuze. The mines are found in Angola, Cyprus, Korea, Lebanon, Rwanda, Thailand, the Western Sahara, although these may in fact have been M15 mines that were misidentified.

== Specifications ==
- Diameter: 13 inches (330 mm)
- Height: 3.6 inches (91 mm) with arming plug
- Weight: 20 pounds (9.1 kg)
- Explosive content: 12 pounds (5.4 kg) of TNT
- Operating pressure: 350 pounds (160 kg)
