= B-Stabmine =

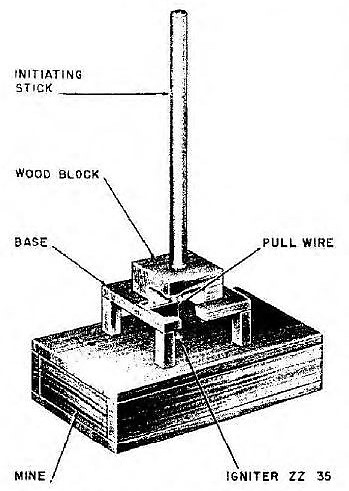
- Type: Anti-tank mine
- Place of origin: Germany

Service history
- In service: 1943-1945
- Used by: Wehrmacht
- Wars: World War II

Specifications
- Mass: 2.7–3.2 kg (6–7 lb)
- Length: 28 cm (11 in)
- Width: 15 cm (6 in)
- Height: 8.9 cm (3.5 in)
- Filling: Pentrite
- Filling weight: 2.6 kg (5.7 lb)

The B-Stabmine (Behelfs-Stabmine) or Makeshift Stickmine in English was an anti-tank mine that was developed by Germany and used by the Wehrmacht during World War II.

== Design ==
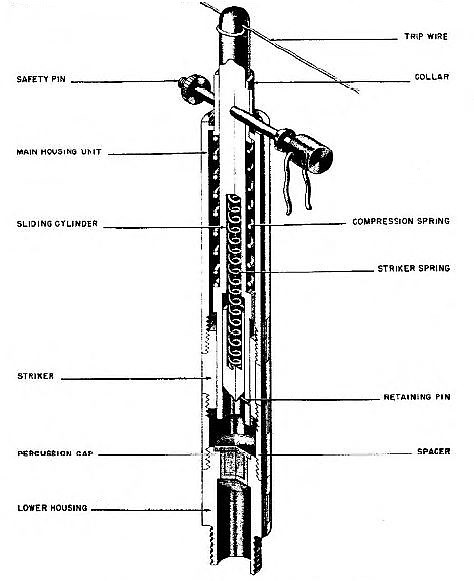
Z.Z. 35 fuze

The B-Stabmine was designed to be a low cost, and easy to produce anti-tank mine which could utilize the woodworking industry while relieving pressure on the overstretched metalworking industry. An advantage of a wooden mine is that it is hard to detect with metal detectors since there are few metal components but in wet conditions, the wood could rot and the explosives could become wet.

The body of the B-Stabmine consisted of a wooden box filled with an explosive called Pentrite and had a raised hollow center section with an initiating stick that was connected to a pull wire which was connected to a Z.Z. 35 (Zugzünder 35) fuze inside the lid of the mine. The Z.Z. 35 could be used either as a tilt-rod fuze or as a tripwire fuze. The main components of the Z.Z. 35 were a striker, spring and percussion cap. When the initiating stick was knocked over by 4.1–5.9 kg (9–13 lb) of force the pull wire released the striker which was under pressure from the spring and the striker detonated the percussion cap and then the mine. The B-Stabmine was not a hollow charge weapon and relied on blast effect instead.

The B-Stabmine was camouflaged brown to blend with its surroundings and was used in tall grass and on beaches.

== Similar mines ==
- TM-57 - A Soviet anti-tank mine.
- TMRP-6 - A Yugoslavian anti-tank mine.
