= Zouk (disambiguation) =

Zouk is a style of Caribbean music and dance. It may also refer to:

== Music ==
- Zouk Machine, an all-female compas or zouk group from Guadeloupe

== Places ==
- Zouk Mikael, municipality in Keserwan District, Mount Lebanon, Lebanon
- Zouk Mosbeh, municipality in Keserwan District, Mount Lebanon, Lebanon

== Other ==
- Brazilian Zouk, a style of Brazilian dance
- Zouk (club), a nightclub in Singapore
- ZoukOut, an annual dance music festival held in Singapore
- Zouk Mosbeh SC, a Lebanese sports club based in Zouk Mosbeh

== See also ==
- Zoukpangbeu, a village in western Ivory Coast
- Zoukougbeu, a town in west-central Ivory Coast
- Zoukougbeu Department, a department of Haut-Sassandra Region in Sassandra-Marahoué District, Ivory Coast
