= No 6 mine =

Israeli anti-tank mine

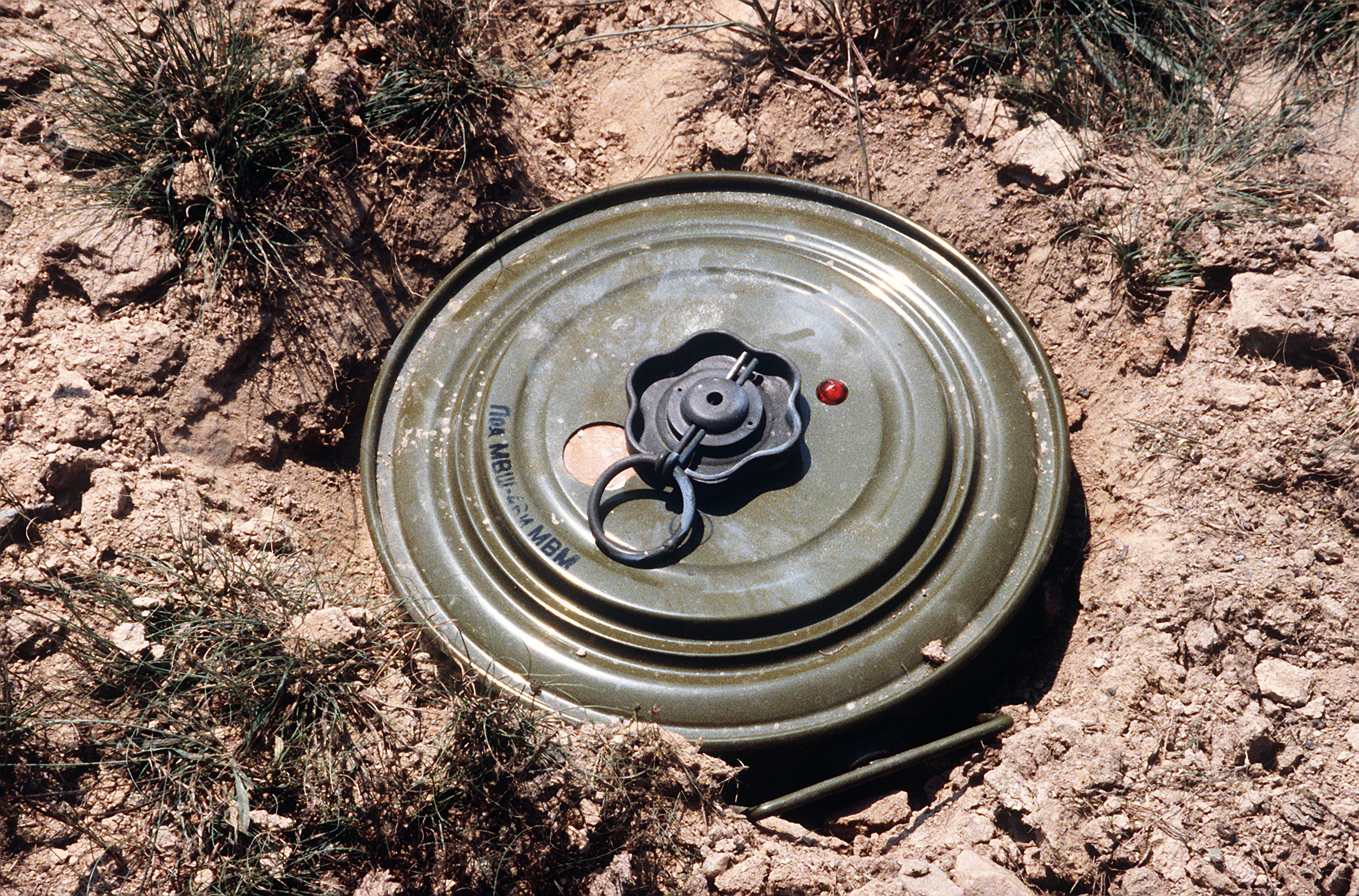
A Russian TM-46 AP landmine in the mud.

The No 6 mine is an Israeli metal-cased anti-tank blast mine. It is a direct copy of the Russian TM-46 mine, the only notable difference being the filling cap, which is domed on the TM-46 and flat on the No 6. It can be fitted with the No 61 pressure fuze or a No 62A tilt rod fuze.

== Usage ==
The No 6 mine is found in the Falkland Islands, Israel, Lebanon and Oman.

== Specifications ==
- Diameter: 305 mm
- Height: 110 mm
- Weight: 8 kg
- Explosive content: 6 kg of TNT
- Operating pressure: 260 kg (No 61 pressure fuze)
