= Belleville, Sassandra-Marahoué =

Belleville
- Village
- Location in Ivory Coast
- Coordinates: 6°52′N 6°51′W
- Country: Ivory Coast
- District: Sassandra-Marahoué
- Region: Haut-Sassandra
- Department: Zoukougbeu
- Sub-prefecture: Zoukougbeu

Population (2014 census)
  - Village: 18,202
- Time zone: UTC+0 (GMT)

Belleville is a village in Ivory Coast. It is in the sub-prefecture of Zoukougbeu, Zoukougbeu Department, Haut-Sassandra Region, Sassandra-Marahoué District.

Belleville was a commune until March 2012, when it became one of 1,126 communes nationwide that were abolished.
