= TM-46 mine =

Soviet/Russian Anti-Tank Mine

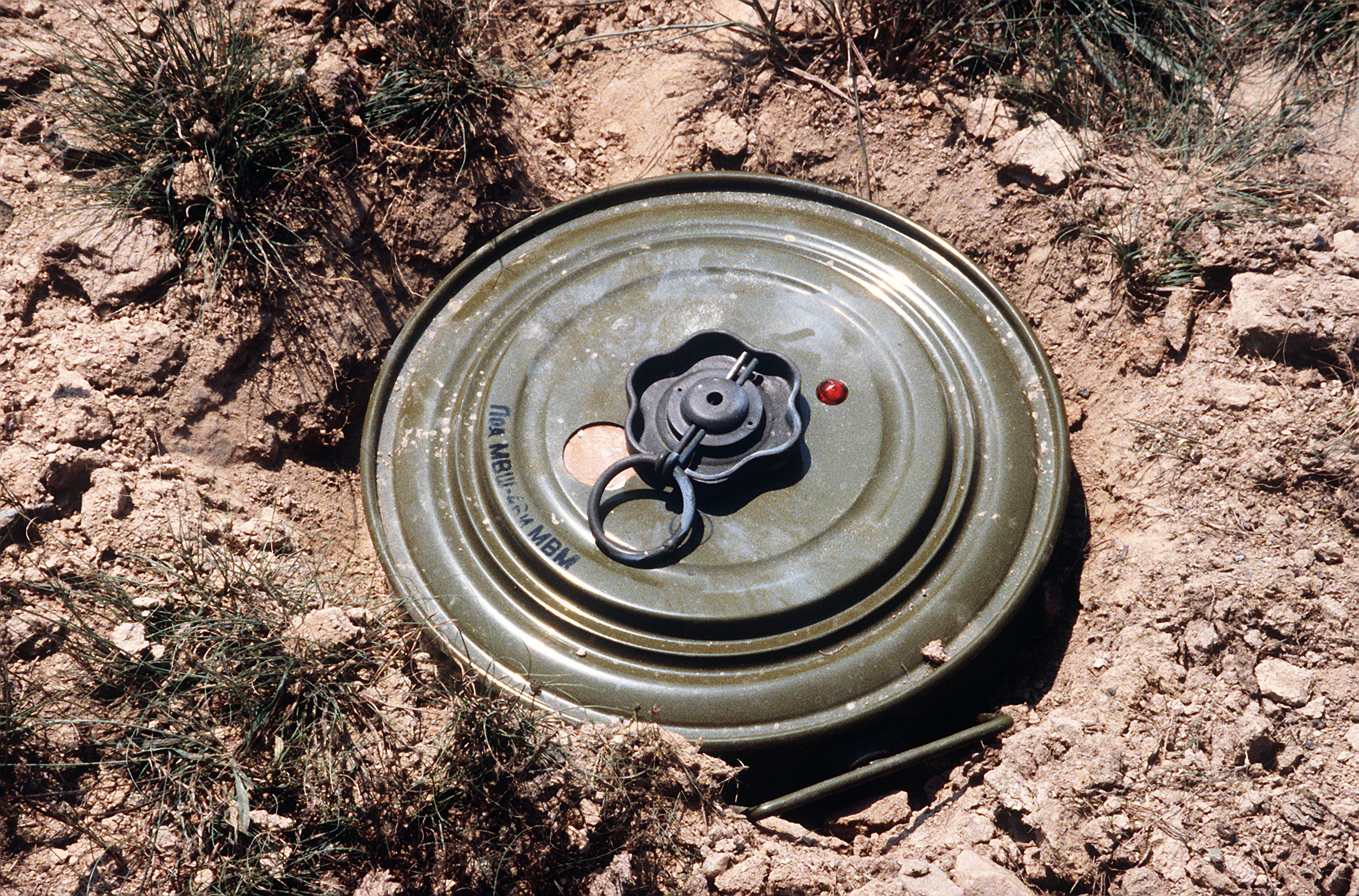
TM-46 anti-tank mine with the arming pin still in place

The TM-46 mine is a large, circular, metal-cased Soviet anti-tank mine. It uses either a pressure or tilt-rod fuze, which is screwed into the top. Anti-tank mines with this type of fuze were capable of inflicting much more damage to armored vehicles, when compared to a typical anti-personnel mine.

Because the TM-46 has a metal casing, it is very easy to detect with a metal detector. However, mine-fields containing TM-46s may have also been sown with minimum metal mines, e.g. the PMA-2.

== Combat use ==
The mine was used by the People's Army of Vietnam during the Vietnam War, and is found in many countries in Africa, the Middle East and Southeast Asia.

== Action ==
=== MVM-583 fuze ===
The MVM-583 is a mechanical pressure fuze. The activation pressure of this fuze is 140 kf. It comprises a striking mechanism, safety pin and the MD-6N shock tube detonator.

Upon a vehicle driving over a TM-46 mine equipped with this fuze, the lid of the mine deforms along with the fuze. Upon further deformation, the tip of the fuze casing cuts through the diaphragm in the mine, releasing the striking mechanism, which activates the MD-6N detonator, and causes the explosion of the main charge of the mine.

=== MVSh-46 fuze ===
The MVSh-46 is a mechanical tilt-rod fuze without a safety mechanism. The activation pressure of this fuze is 120–450 kf. The required deviation of the tilt-rod from its initial composition is 25–30°. It comprises a striking mechanism and the MD-10 shock tube detonator.

Upon a vehicle driving over a TM-46 mine equipped with this fuze, the MVSh-46 deforms, activating the MD-10 detonator and causing the explosion of the main charge of the mine.

=== TMN-46 variant ===
The TMN-46 is a variant of the mine fitted with a secondary pull-action fuze MUV-2 (Rus. МУВ-2) well on the bottom (where it cannot be seen), which is slightly off-set from the centre of the mine. It is connected with a thin strip of wire to a peg inserted into the ground. The MUV-2 fuze is hooked to an MD-6N (Rus. МД-6Н) shock tube detonator, which functions as an anti-handling device. Upon trying to move the mine, the wire pulls the fuze, and the mine detonates.

Upon an attempt at dislocation of the TMN-46 mine, the wire attached between the MUV-2 fuze and the peg pulls the safety pin. The fuze actives MD-6N detonator and causes it to explode along with the main charge of the mine.

== Specifications ==
- Diameter: 300 mm
- Height
  - With MVM-583 fuze: 108 mm
  - With MVSh-46 tilt rod fuze: 261 mm
- Pressure plate diameter: 200 mm
- MVM sensitivity: 120–400 kg
- MVSh-46 sensitivity: 190–400 kg
- Weight
  - Full assembly: 8.6 kg
  - Charge: 5.7 kg cast TNT/ammonite, 50% / 50%
- Operating temperature: −60 to +60 °C

== See also ==
- TM-57 mine - an improved version of the TM-46
- TM-62 series of mines
- Teller mine - German original
