= M23 chemical mine =

Steel cased chemical landmine of the 1950s and 1960s

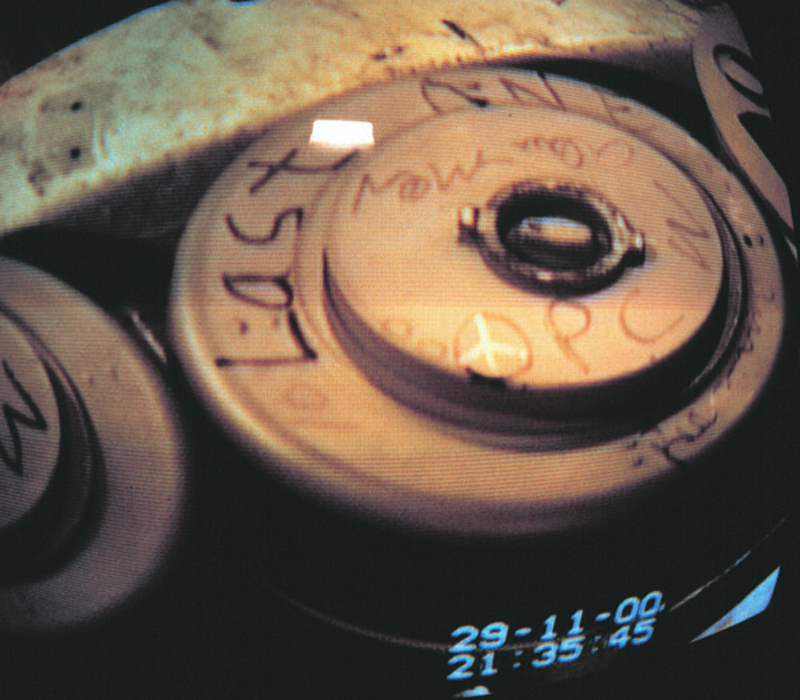
An image from a video showing a VX filled M23 mine.

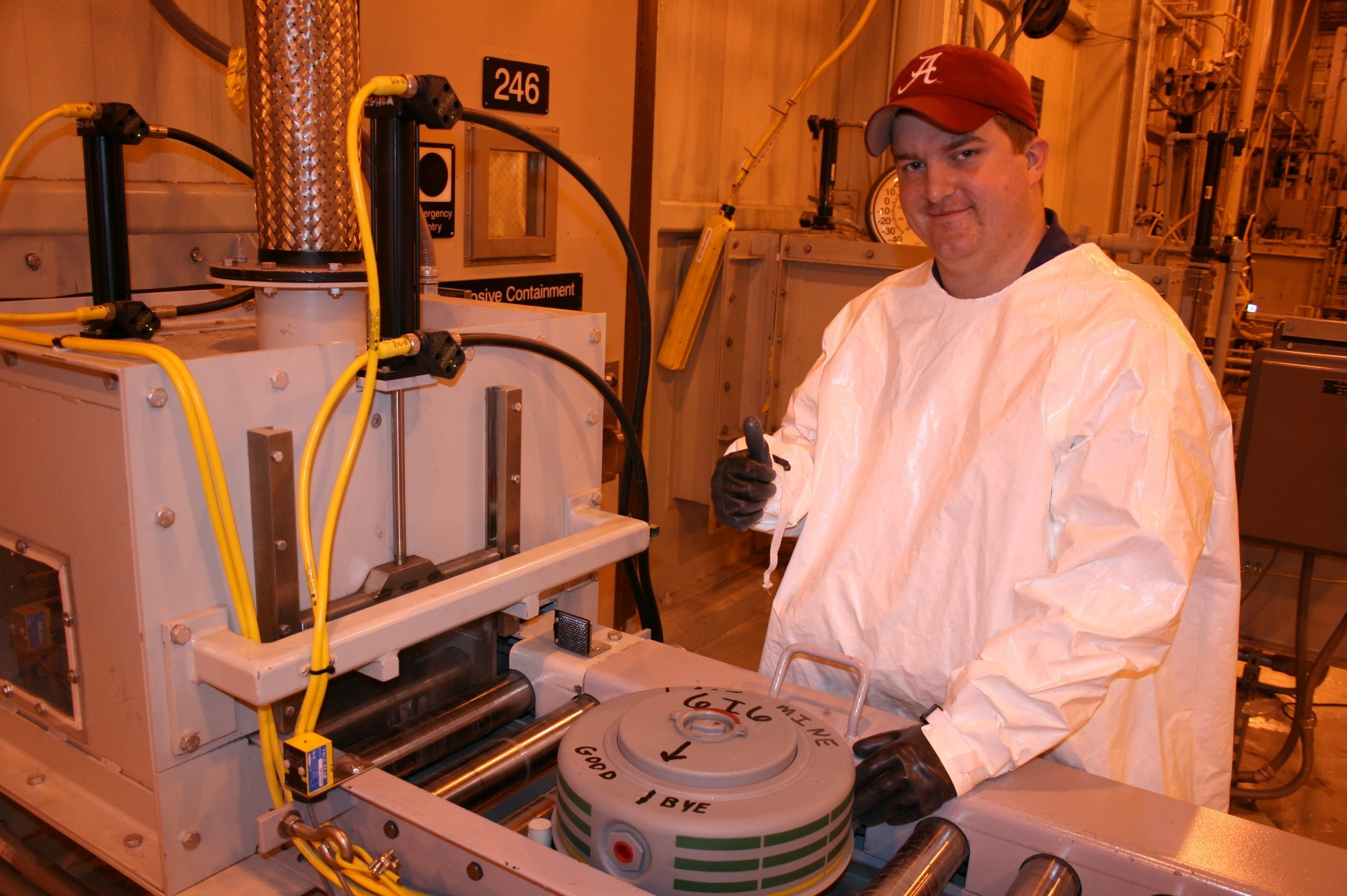
Last M23 mine destruction at ANCDF Site.

The M23 is a United States steel cased chemical landmine. The mine was developed in the late 1950s and early 1960s, and approximately 100,000 units were produced. The U.S. completed its destruction of its stock at the Umatilla Chemical Depot in 2008 and the Johnston Atoll Chemical Agent Disposal System in 2000.

The mine is broadly similar to the M15 anti-tank mine in appearance, with the addition of four pairs of small ridges along the top surface. The mine has two secondary fuse wells in addition to the primary fuse well and can be set to operate either for anti-vehicle or anti-personnel purposes. It is normally fitted with either an M603 or M608 fuse. Upon activation, the bursting charge breaks open a thin steel casing, heating and spraying VX nerve agent to form an aerosol.

== Specifications ==
- Diameter: 13 inches (0.33 m)
- Height: 5 inches (0.13 m)
- Weight unfused: 22 3/4 pounds (10.3 kg)
- Content: 10 1/2 pounds (4.8 kg) of VX nerve agent and 13 ounces (0.37 kilograms) Composition B4 bursting charge.
