= Belville =

Belville can refer to:

== Places ==
- Belville (Belgrade), an urban neighborhood of Belgrade, the capital of Serbia.
- Bell Ville, Córdoba Province, Argentina
  - the Belville meteorite of 1937, which fell in Córdoba, Argentina (see Meteorite falls)
- Belville, County Westmeath, a townland in the civil parish of Ballyloughloe, barony of Clonlonan, County Westmeath, Ireland
- Belville, North Carolina, United States

== People ==
=== Surname ===
- Ruth Belville (1854–1943), known as the Greenwich Time Lady

=== Given name ===
- Belville Robert Pepper (1850–1888), British opera singer

== Toys ==
- Belville (Lego), a line of Lego

== See also ==
- Belleville (disambiguation)
- Bellville (disambiguation)
