= Tilt-rod fuze =

Device that triggers anti-vehicle landmines

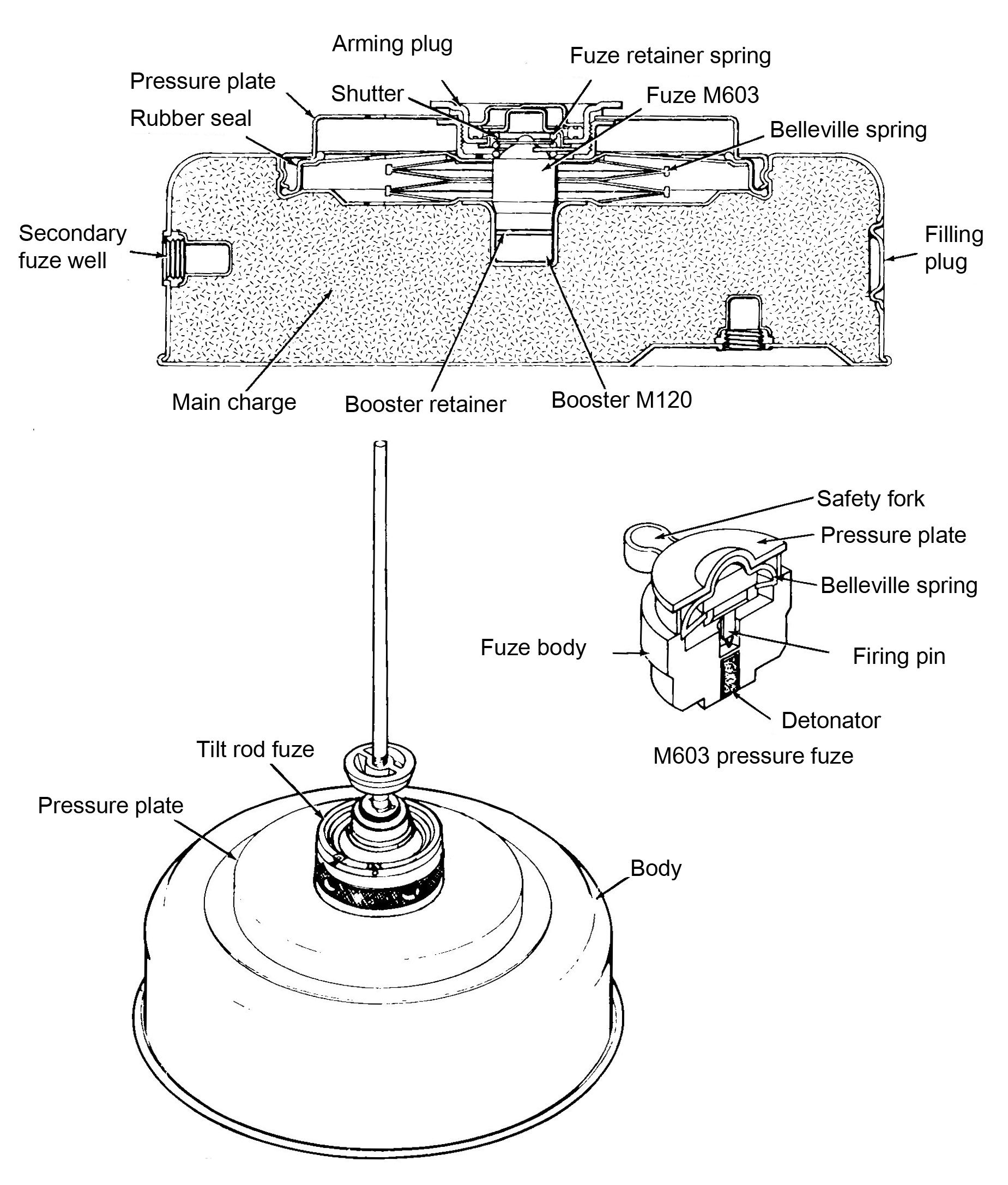
Cross sectional view of an M15 mine with standard M603 fuze, plus the same mine with an M624 tilt rod fuze installed

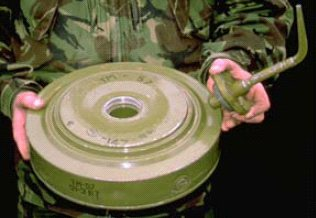
Russian TM-57 mine with a tilt-rod fuze

A tilt-rod fuze is a device used to trigger anti-vehicle landmines. Typically it consists of a vertical pole, normally around a meter high, which is connected to the top of a landmine. When the track or main body of a vehicle passes over the mine, the rod is tilted, releasing a spring-loaded striker which triggers a pyrotechnic delay of approximately half a second, followed by detonation of the main explosive charge. The small time delay allows the vehicle to continue over the mine before detonating, exposing more of it to the blast. A tilt-rod fuze has a number of advantages over pressure fuzes—it acts across the entire width of a vehicle, rather than just its tracks or tires. (Note: For this reason, a mine fitted with a tilt-rod is often referred to as a "full width attack" mine.) This allows it to attack the vehicle's belly and potentially cause a catastrophic kill. Additionally, tilt rod fuzes tend to be resistant to blast overpressure clearing methods, which can trigger most pressure fuzes.

The main disadvantage is the visible rod mechanism, which may be negated by laying the mine in undergrowth. In any case, minefields containing anti-tank mines with tilt rods may also include other designs of mine which are entirely buried (e.g. the M19 anti-tank mine) plus various antipersonnel mines intended to hinder people removing mines.

== See also ==
- M21 mine
- TMRP-6
