= M15 mine =

US anti-tank mine

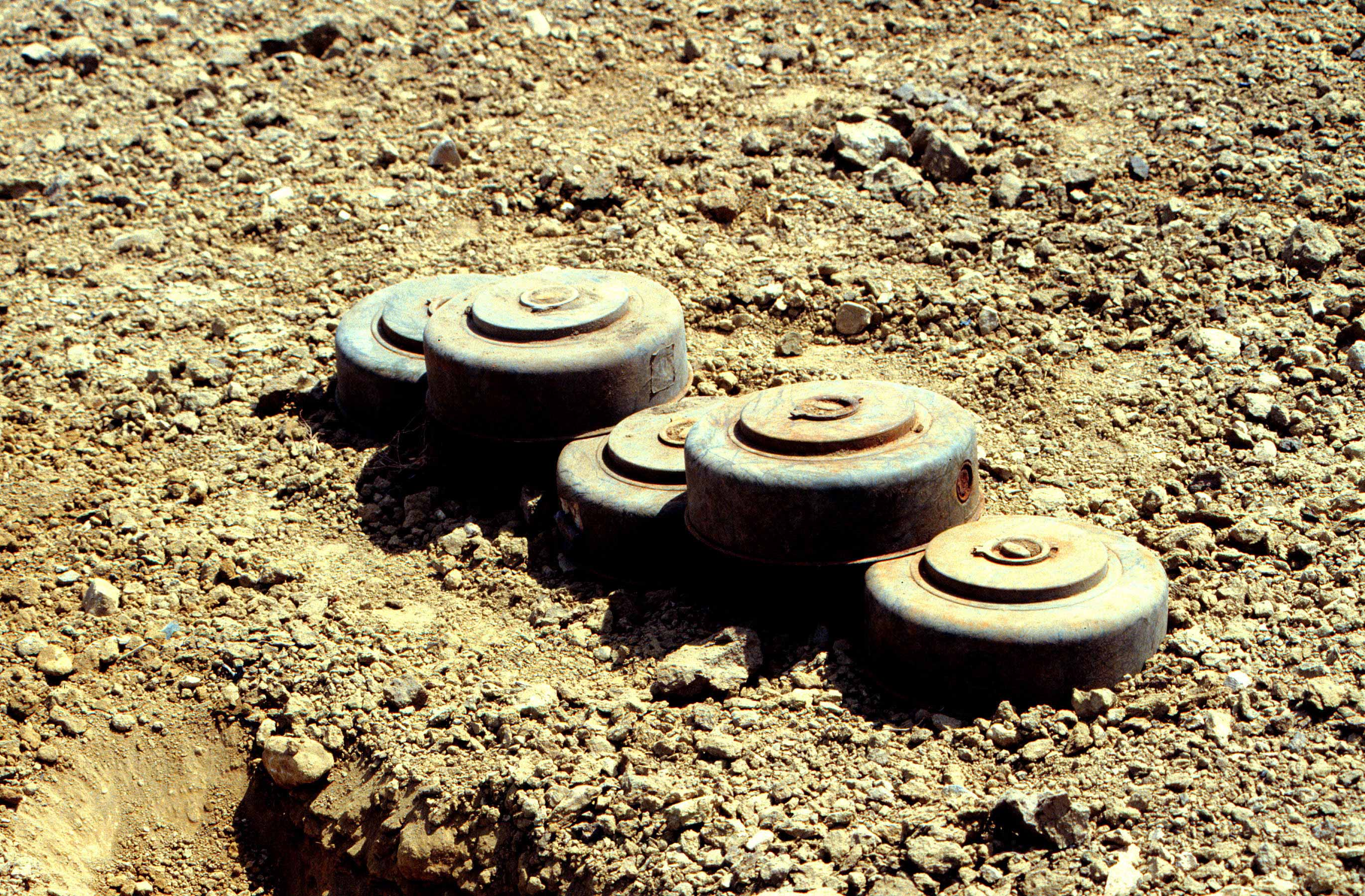
Five M15 landmines (recovered from a Cuban mine-field) await destruction. The top two mines show additional fuze wells

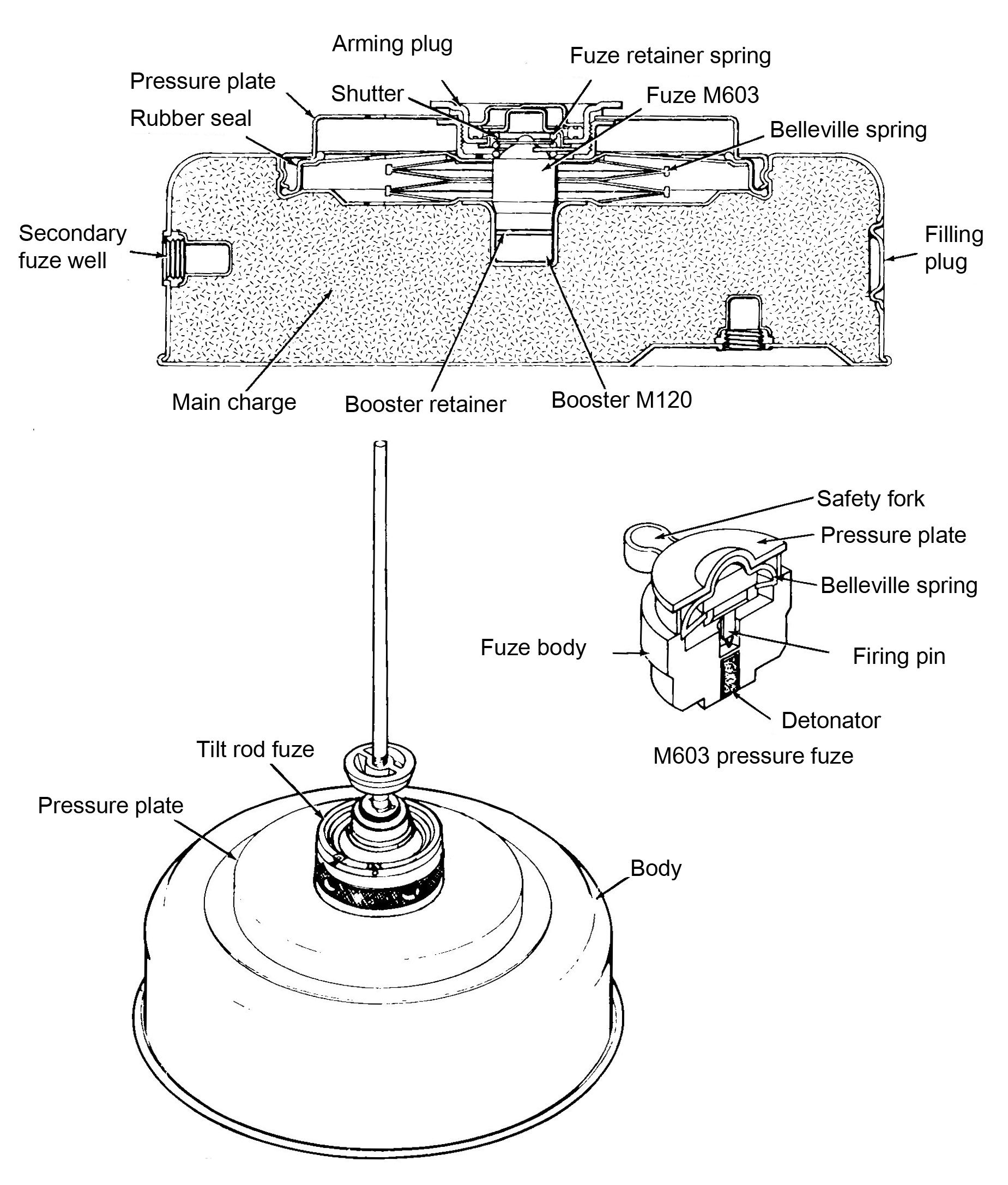
Cross sectional view of an M15 mine, and an M603 fuze, as well as the appearance of a mine with an M624 tilt-rod fuze installed

The M15 mine is a large circular United States anti-tank blast mine, first deployed during the Korean War. Essentially, it is a larger version of the M6A2 anti-tank mine, which it replaced. Although the M15 has been superseded by the M19 mine (a plastic-cased minimum metal mine of more modern design), the U.S. retains large stocks of M15s because they are still regarded as reliable and effective weapons. When used against main battle tanks the M15 is primarily a "track-breaker" which creates mobility kills, but it has a comparatively small likelihood of causing crew fatalities. However, when used against light vehicles such as APCs or unarmored vehicles such as trucks the damage it can inflict is much more severe.

== Description ==
The mine consists of a large, circular rounded steel case, with a central pressure plate. In the center of the pressure plate is the M4 arming plug, which has an arming lever which can be set to "ARMED" or "SAFE". The pressure plate sits on top of a belleville spring, which in turn rests directly over the M603 fuze. When sufficient downward pressure is applied to the pressure plate (i.e. when a vehicle drives over it) the concertina spring is compressed. This action transfers pressure onto the M603 fuze which fires, triggering detonation. Because this mine has a metallic case, it is very easy to find it using even the most basic mine detector. However, a complicating factor is posed by the two secondary fuze wells. These enable anti-handling devices to be fitted: one on the side of the mine and one underneath. Additionally, a minefield containing M15 mines may also contain a number of minimum metal M19 mines, plus various antipersonnel mines of different types (e.g. the VS-MK2, SB-33, TS-50, PMA-2 or PMA-3), all of which are specifically designed to be difficult to find using metal mine detectors.

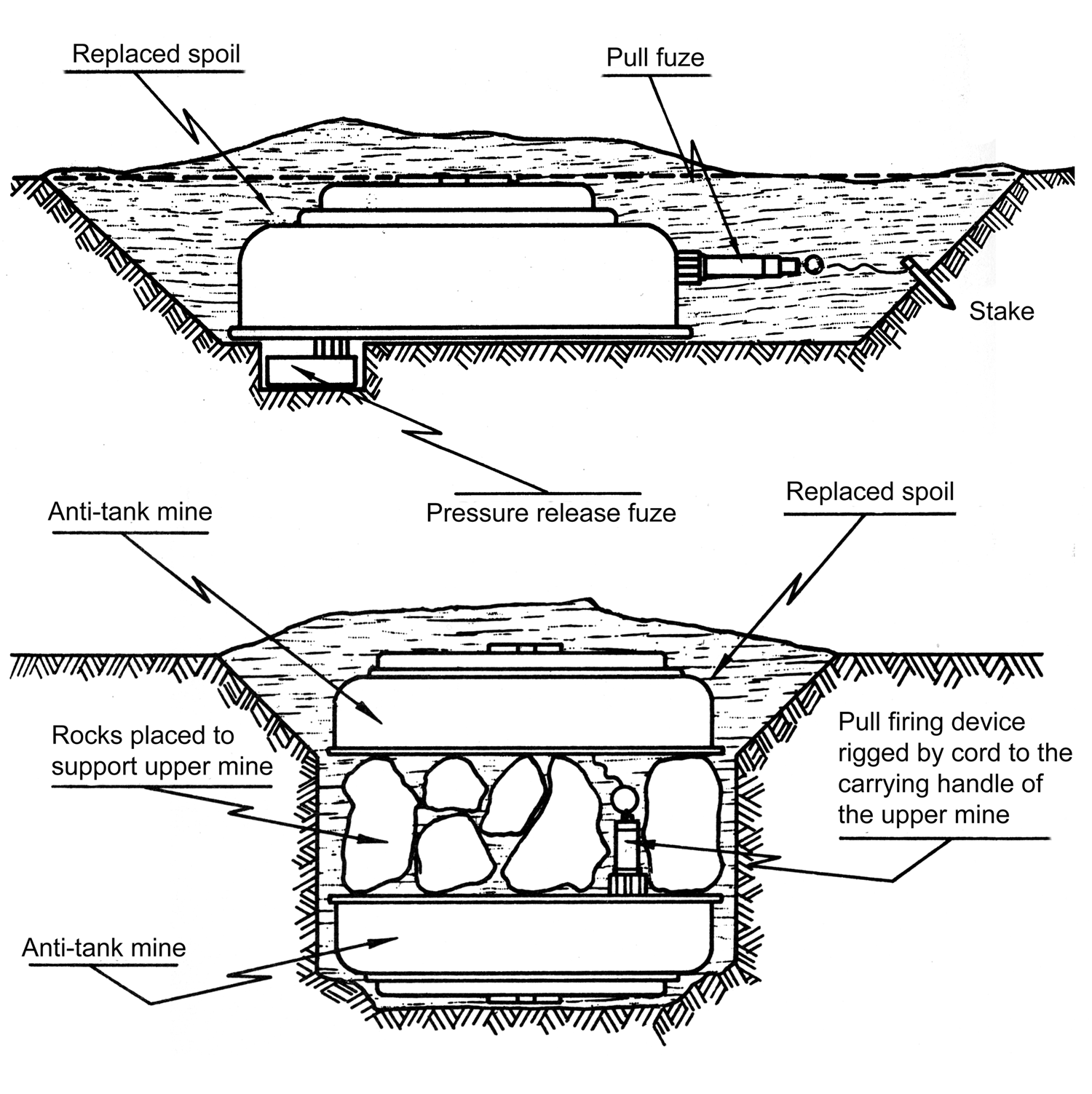
Typical configuration of anti-handling devices used with M15 mines. The upper diagram shows a pull-fuze screwed into a secondary fuze well in the side of the mine. Additionally, an M5 anti-lift device has been screwed into another fuze well, hidden under the mine. An inexperienced deminer might detect and render safe the pull-fuze, but then be killed when he lifted the mine, triggering the M5 pressure-release firing device underneath. The lower diagram shows two anti-tank landmines connected by a cord attached to the upper mine's carrying handle. The cord is attached to a pull fuze installed in a secondary fuze well in the bottom mine.

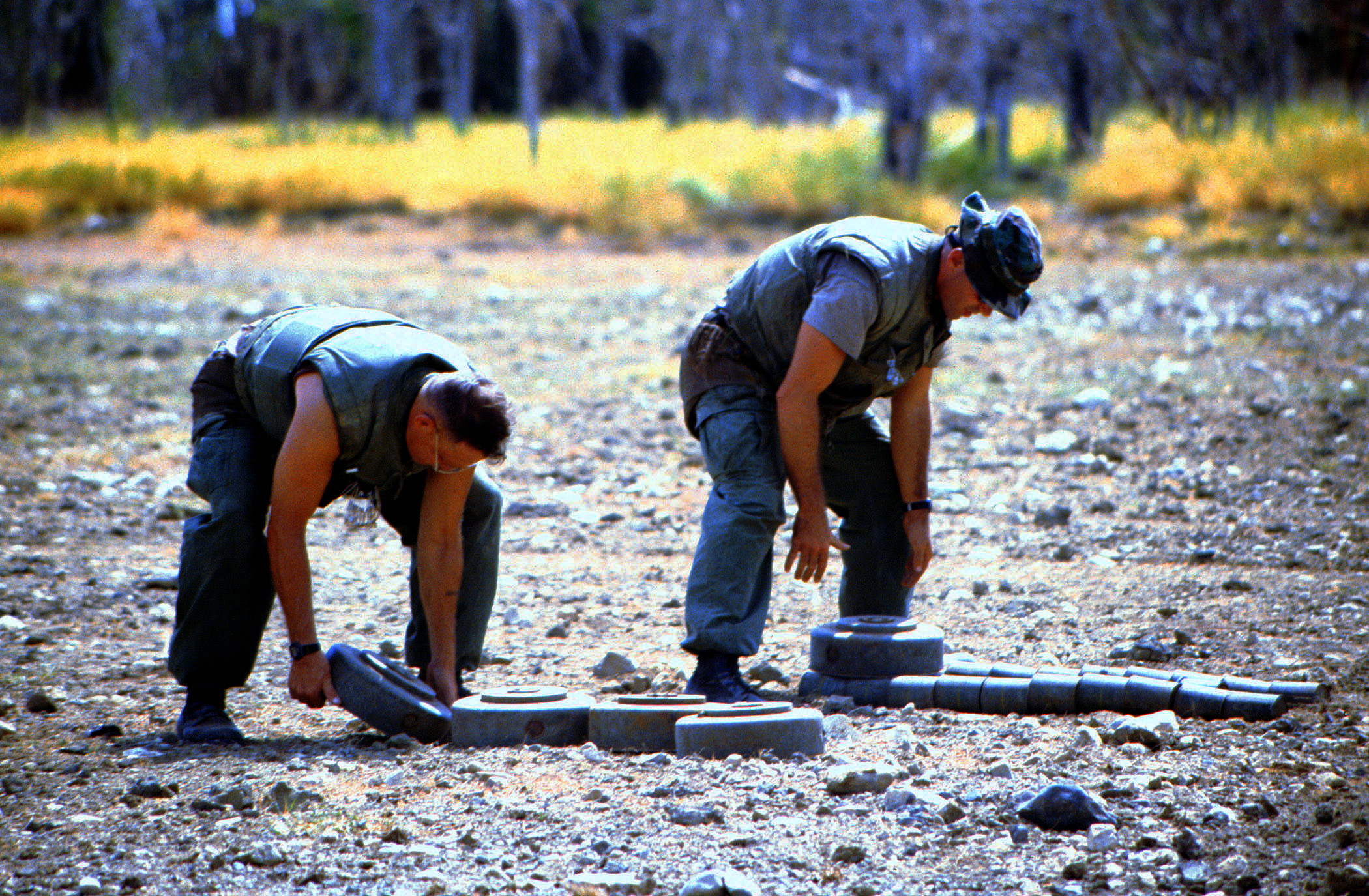
M15 mines removed from a Cuban minefield being stacked for disposal. Three of them show additional fuze wells on the side

== Fuzes ==
The M15 mine was originally intended to be fitted with the M600 single-impulse fuze, which contained a glass ampoule of liquid explosive. Unfortunately, the M600 fuze was sensitive to temperature variations and therefore unreliable. For example, freezing temperatures made the mine inert as the liquid froze, whereas temperatures above 50 degrees Celsius could cause the fuze to detonate spontaneously. Just as problematic was that M600 fuzes were inherently unstable, making them dangerous to handle, particularly after having been kept in storage for some time.

Because of these shortcomings, the M600 chemical fuze was removed from service around 1953 and replaced by the M603 single-impulse fuze, which used a mechanical trigger mechanism i.e. a belleville spring. The stockpile of M600 fuzes was destroyed at this time after being deemed too dangerous to use. The M603 fuze is inherently safe to handle and much more reliable. In addition to the standard M603 fuze, two additional fuzes are available: the M624 tilt-rod fuze (which offers full-width attack capability) and the M608 double-impulse fuze. The M624 fuze requires 3.75 pounds-force (16.7 N) of force to move the tilt rod, and once it exceeds 20 degrees of tilt the mine will detonate.

The M608 double-impulse fuze will not detonate the mine when the first tank drives over it: instead, it simply arms itself so that the mine detonates when the second vehicle (e.g. an APC or perhaps a truck towing a howitzer) following in the tracks of the first tank drives over it – an event which might occur seconds, hours or even weeks later. The M608 double-impulse fuze is particularly useful when fitted to mines located on the outer edges of minefields, because this gives tank operators a false sense of security. The lead tank, for instance, can drive over 30 mines fitted with double-impulse fuzes without detonating any of them. This lures tank operators deep into the minefield, where they eventually trigger mines fitted with the M603 or M624 fuze (both of which operate exclusively in single-impulse mode) and become trapped. Attempts to recover the tanks or rescue victims are hindered by the fact that the M608-fitted mines previously driven over are now operating in single-impulse mode, and also because minefields containing M15 mines usually contain various antipersonnel mines as well, for instance the M14 mine and M16 bounding mine. An additional benefit of double-impulse fuzes is that they give mines a degree of protection against clearance techniques which use blast overpressure or mine roller systems.

== Specifications ==
- Weight: 14.3 kg
- Explosive content: 10.3 kg of Composition B
- Diameter: 333 mm
- Height: 150 mm
- Operating pressure: 160 to 340 kg (for the M603 pressure fuze)

== Users ==
- United States: The United States holds a large inventory of this mine. In 1984 it had approximately 1,904,000 M15 mines in storage, of which around 70% were serviceable.

== See also ==
- M23 chemical mine
