= Domangbeu =

- Town and sub-prefecture
- Location in Ivory Coast
- Coordinates: 7°3′N 7°2′W
- Country: Ivory Coast
- District: Sassandra-Marahoué
- Region: Haut-Sassandra
- Department: Zoukougbeu

Population (2014)
  - Total: 9,530
- Time zone: UTC+0 (GMT)

Domangbeu is a town in western Ivory Coast. It is a sub-prefecture of Zoukougbeu Department in Haut-Sassandra Region, Sassandra-Marahoué District.

Domangbeu was a commune until March 2012, when it became one of 1,126 communes nationwide that were abolished.

In 2014, the population of the sub-prefecture of Domangbeu was 9,530.

== Villages ==
The five villages of the sub-prefecture of Domangbeu and their population in 2014 are:

1. Bahibli (513)
2. Didibobli (557)
3. Domangbeu (3,390)
4. Gbelibli (1,539)
5. Litobli (3,531)
