= TM-57 mine =

Soviet anti-tank mine

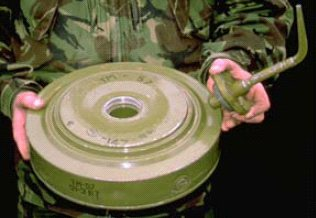
A TM-57 with a tilt-rod fuze

The TM-57 mine is a large, circular Soviet metal-cased blast anti-tank mine. It can either be triggered by pressure or a tilt-rod fuze. A development of the TM-46 mine, but with more explosive. It is found in Africa (including Angola and Ethiopia), the Middle East, and South East Asia.

== Description ==
The TM-57 has a larger main charge and improved fuzing compared to the earlier TM-46. It is circular with a metal case and a central fuze well. A secondary pull-action fuze MUV-2 (Rus. МУВ-2) or VPF (Rus. ВПФ) pull and tilt fuze can be fitted on the side of the mine, which serves as an anti-handling device. The tilt rod fuze gives the mine improved resistance to blast; it is activated when it is forced to a deflection of 25 to 30 degrees. A training version of the mine that produces smoke is designated the TM-60.

== Specifications ==
- Diameter: 320 mm
- Height:
  - With MV-57 fuze: 110 mm
  - With MVZ-57 fuze: 128 mm
  - With MVSh-57 fuze: 320 mm
- Pressure plate diameter: 220 mm
- Weight: 9.5 kilograms (21 lb)
- Explosive content:
  - 6.5 kg TNT
  - 7 kg MS mixture (RDX, TNT, aluminium, wax)
  - 7 kg TGA mixture (RDX, TNT, aluminium)
- Sensitivity:
  - MV-57 and MVZ-57: 40–110 kg; operating travel 3–20 mm
  - MVSh-57: 200–500 kg; tilt 25–30°
- Operating temperature: −50 to +50 °C
- Fuse:
  - MV-57 pressure.
  - MVZ-57 pressure.
  - MVSh-57 tilt with MD019 detonator.

== See also ==
- Land mine
