= Bellville =

Bellville may refer to:

Argentina

- Bell Ville, Córdoba

South Africa

- Bellville, Western Cape
  - Bellville railway station

United States

- Bellville, Georgia
- Bellville, Missouri
- Bellville, Ohio
- Bellville, Texas

== See also ==
- Belleville (disambiguation)
- Belville (disambiguation)
