= M21 mine =

American circular anti-tank landmine

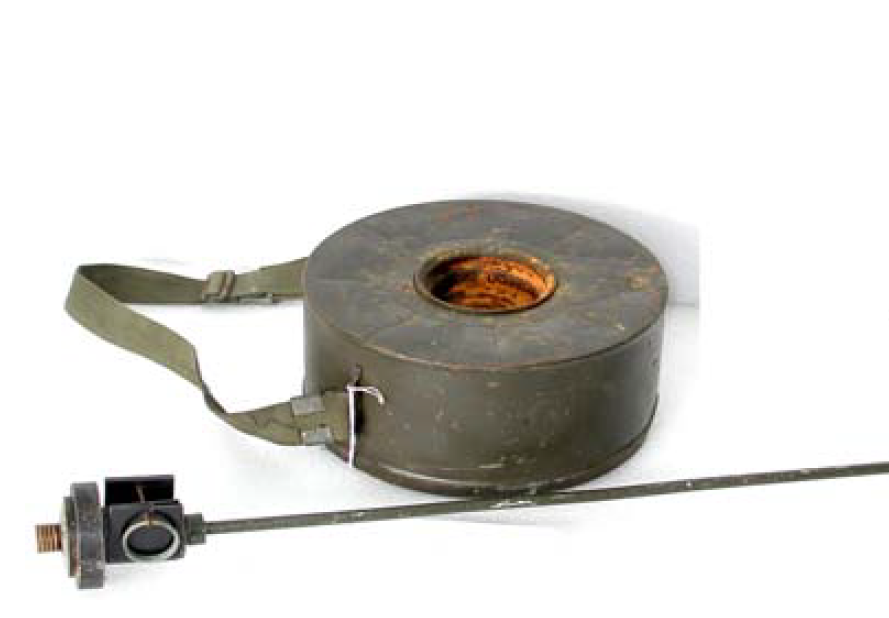
M21 mine with M607 fuze

The M21 is a circular United States anti-tank landmine that uses a Misznay Schardin effect warhead. The mine uses an M607 pressure fuse, which can be adapted as a tilt rod fuze. The mine is triggered either by pressure, or by the tilt rod being forced beyond 20 degrees from the vertical by a force of more than 1.7 kg, either of these actions results in pressure being transferred via a bearing cap to a Belleville spring, which inverts, driving the firing pin into the M46 detonator. The M46 charge first ignites a black powder charge, which blows off the mine's cover, and clears any earth or debris that may have been on top of the mine. A fraction of a second later the main warhead detonates, driving and compressing a steel plate upwards, with enough force to penetrate 76 mm of armour at a distance of 530 mm. Approximately 200,000 M21 mines were produced in the U.S. and licensed copies, the K441 and K442, were produced in South Korea.

== Specifications ==
- Diameter: 229 mm
- Height: 206 mm
- Height with tilt rod: 813 mm
- Weight: 7.83 kg
- Explosive content: 4.9 kg of Composition H6
- Operating pressure:
  - pressure: 132 kg
  - tilt: 1.7 kg
