= MD-82 mine =

Vietnamese anti-personnel mine

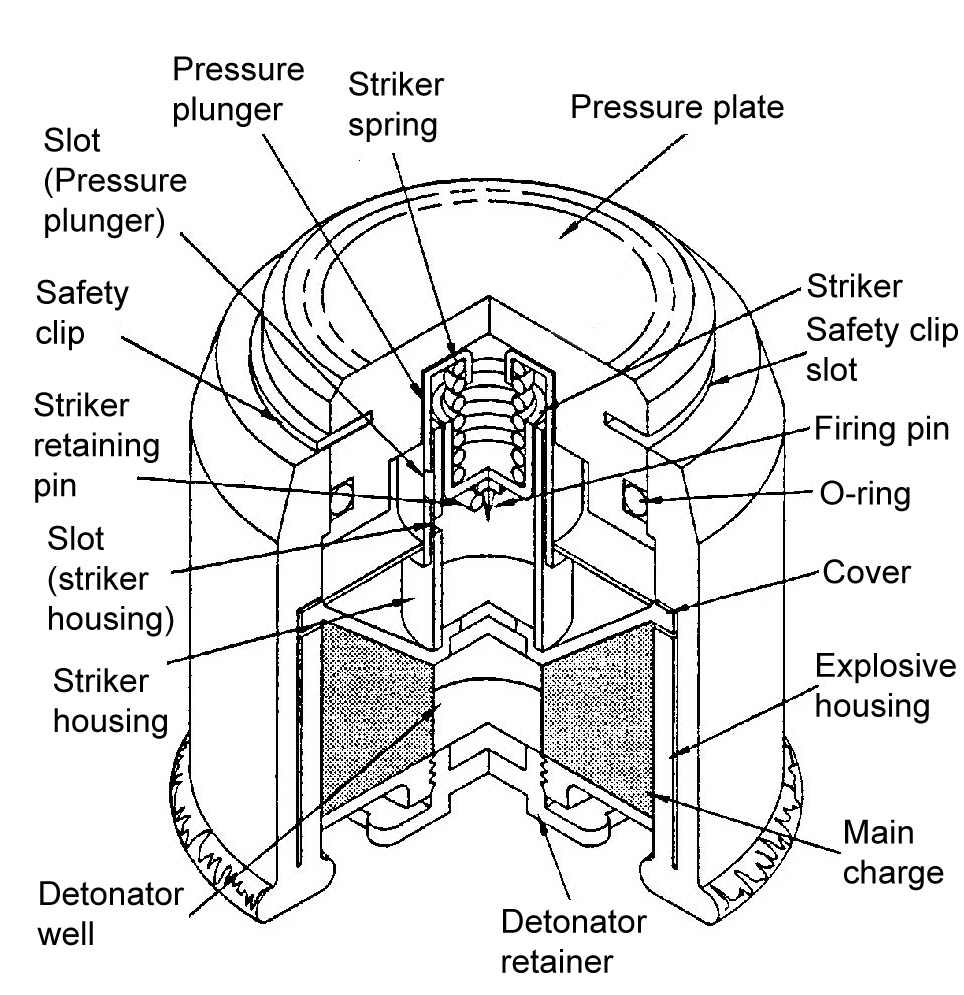
A cutaway of an MD-82 mine.

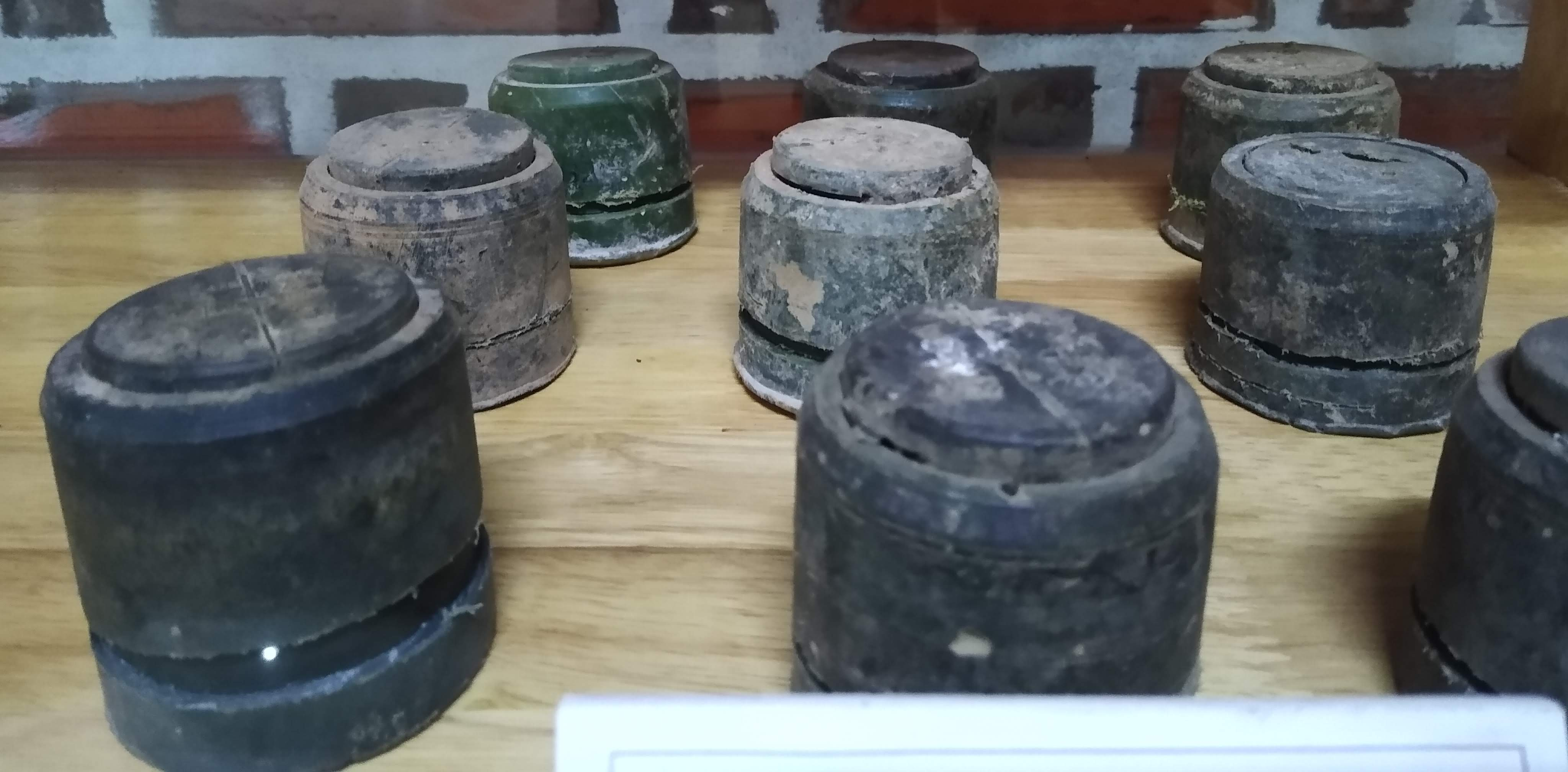
MD-82B mines on display at the APOPO Visitor Center in Siem Reap, Cambodia

The MD-82 is a Vietnamese anti-personnel blast mine, that is broadly similar to the United States M14 mine, although the fuzing system is different.

== Specifications ==
- Height: 57 mm
- Diameter: 53 mm
- Weight: 100 g approx
- Explosive content: 28 g TNT
- Activation pressure: 4 to 5 kg
