= M1 mine =

United States anti-tank land mine

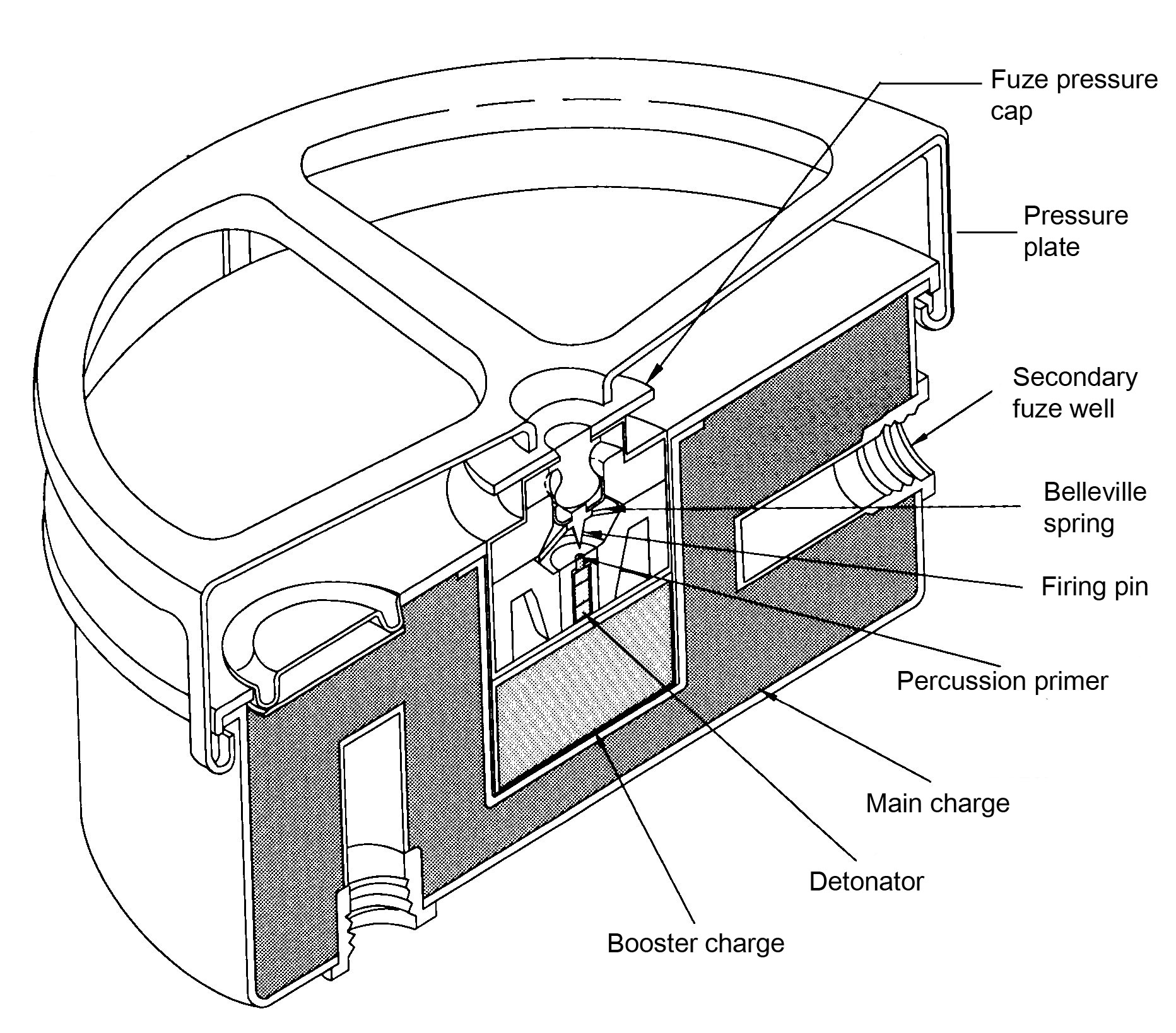
A cutaway showing the M4 mine in cross-section.

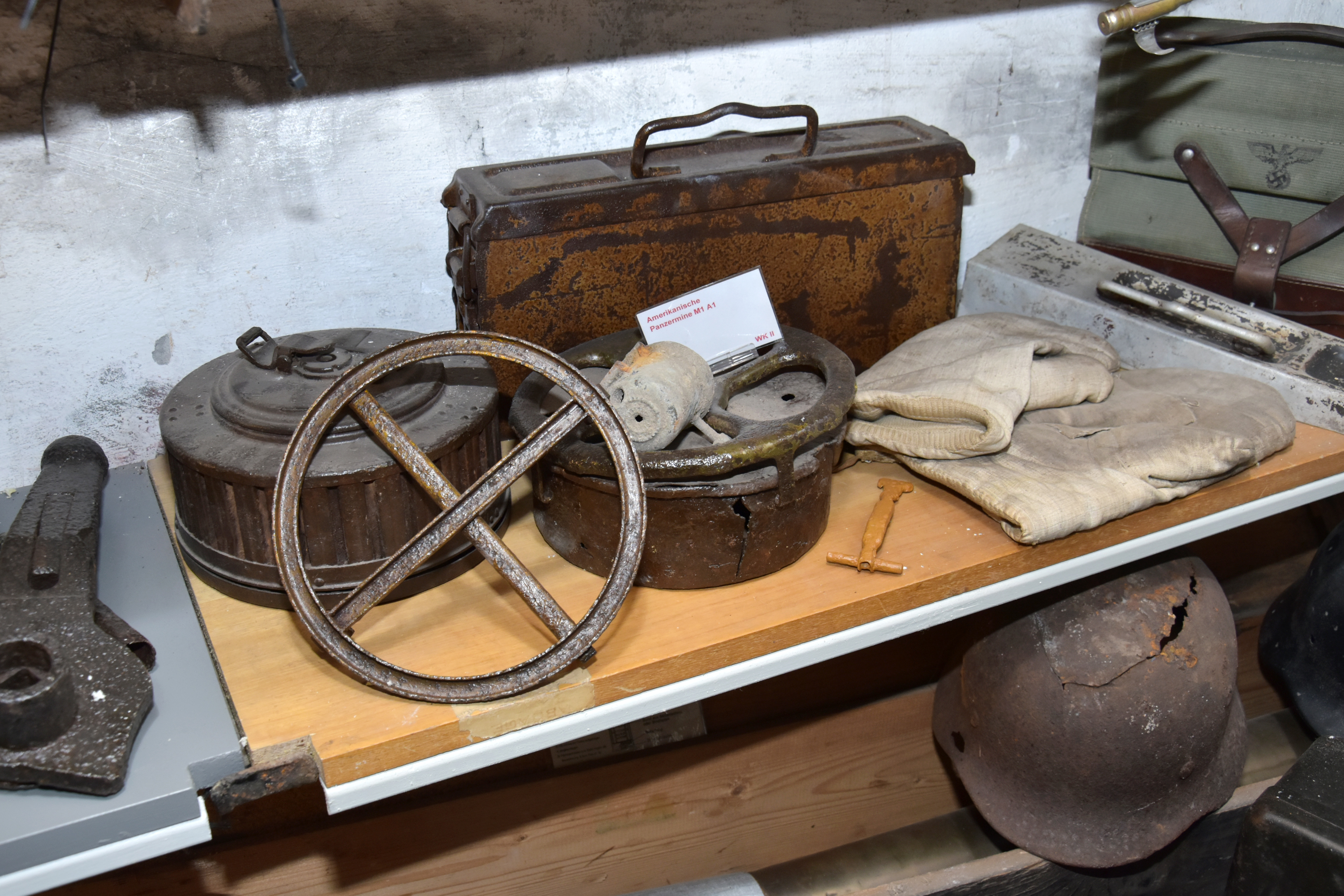
M1 mine

The M1, M1A1 and M4 are circular steel cased United States anti-tank blast mines with a distinctive cross shaped pressure spider. The mine was used during the Second World War and a copy produced in Argentina was used during the Falklands War. Another copy is produced in China, there designated as the No. 4 mine. Variants of the mine have also been deployed in Chad and Tunisia.

Downward pressure on the spider presses down on the head of the fuze, breaks a shear pin, and inverts a belleville spring, flipping the striker downwards into a stab sensitive detonator, triggering the mine. The M4 version of the mine has two secondary fuze wells so that anti-handling devices can be fitted.

== Variants ==
- M1 – the mine has two filler plugs on the top surface.
- M1A1 – the mine has a single filler plug on the top surface.
- M4 – as the M1A1 but with two secondary fuze wells, one on the side and one in the bottom.

== Specifications ==
- Weight: 4.80 kg
- Explosive content: 2.70 kg of TNT
- Height: 102 mm
- Diameter: 203 mm
- Operating pressure: 120 kg to 250 kg
