= M19 mine =

US anti-tank mine

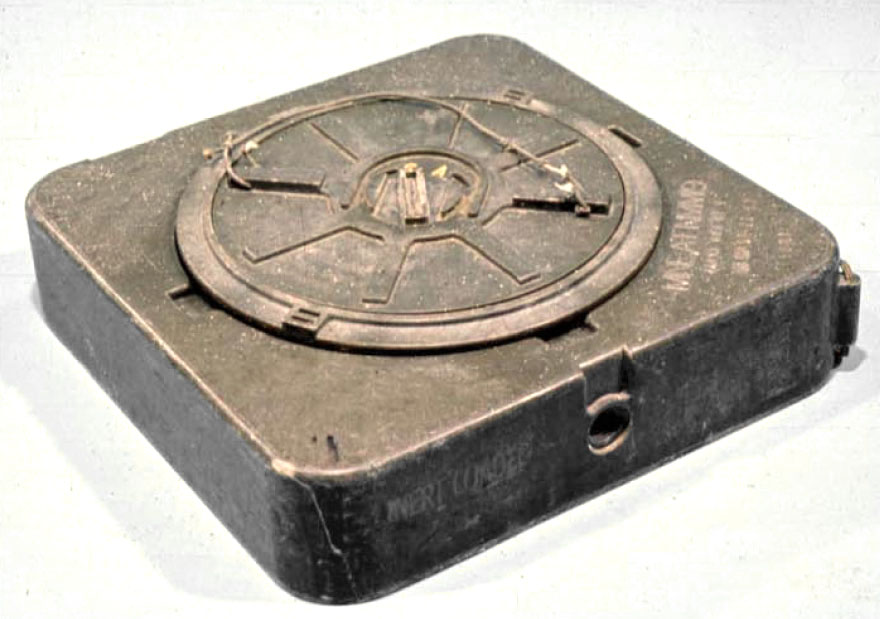
An inert M19 anti-tank mine. The arming switch is set to "S" (i.e. safe) so the fuze is not armed. A secondary fuze well (with the cap removed) is visible on the side of the mine

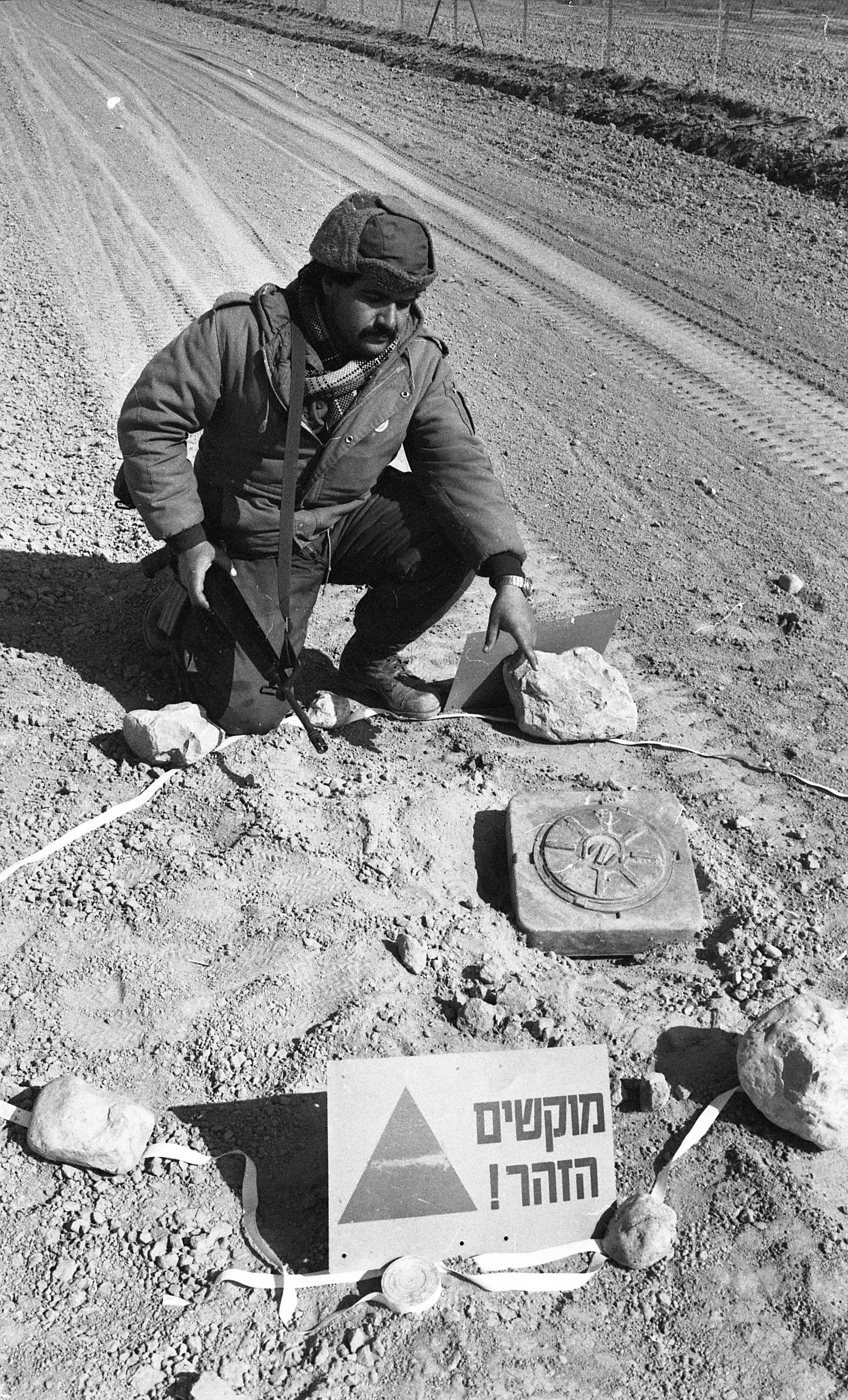
An Israeli soldier with an M19 anti-tank mine near the Jordanian border in 1982.

The M19 is a large square plastic cased United States anti-tank blast mine. Intended to replace the M15 mine, the design dates from the mid-1960s and contains only two metal components: the copper detonator capsule and a stainless steel firing pin which weighs 2.86 grams. It is a minimum metal mine, which makes it very difficult to detect after it has been emplaced. This mine is produced under licence in Chile, South Korea and Turkey. A copy is produced in Iran. It is found in Afghanistan, Angola, Chad, Chile, Cyprus, Iran, Iraq, Jordan, South Korea, Lebanon, the Western Sahara, and Zambia.

U.S. stocks of the mine were approximately 74,000 before the 1990 Gulf War and had fallen to 63,000 by 2002.

An inert version of the mine intended for training purposes (called the M80) is also produced.

== Description ==
The plastic casing of the mine is usually dark olive green, and has a large central fuze well. Normally it has a carrying handle on one side. The mine is normally fitted with the M606 fuze which has an arming switch with two settings, S(afe) and A(rmed). These markings are either painted in yellow or embossed into the plastic. When the switch is set to "A" and the safety clip is removed, the mine will detonate if a vehicle drives over it. The firing mechanism is triggered by a belleville spring which flips the firing pin downwards into the stab detonator, setting off the adjacent booster charge and main explosive filling.

The mine is also fitted with two secondary fuze wells which allow anti-handling devices to be fitted e.g. the M1 pull fuze or M5 "mouse-trap" anti-lift fuze. Either or both of the secondary fuze wells on an M19 mine may be fitted with an antihandling device.

A minefield containing M19s is usually protected by various anti-personnel mines such as the M14 and M16 bounding mine.

== Specifications ==
- Weight: 12.56 kg
- Explosive content: 9.53 kg of Composition B
- Length: 332 mm
- Width: 332 mm
- Height: 94 mm
- Operating pressure: 118 to 226 kg (although possibly as low as 90 kg)
