= Belleville, Bouaké =

Belleville
- Neighbourhood of Bouaké
- Location in Ivory Coast
- Coordinates: 7°41′N 5°1′W
- Country: Ivory Coast
- District: Vallée du Bandama
- Region: Gbêkê
- Department: Bouaké
- Sub-prefecture: Bouaké-Ville
- Time zone: UTC+0 (GMT)

Belleville is a neighbourhood of Bouaké, Ivory Coast. Administratively, it is in the sub-prefecture of Bouaké-Ville, Bouaké Department, Gbêkê Region, Vallée du Bandama District.

Belleville was a commune until March 2012, when it became one of 1,126 communes nationwide that were abolished.
