= TMRP-6 =

Former Yugoslavian mine

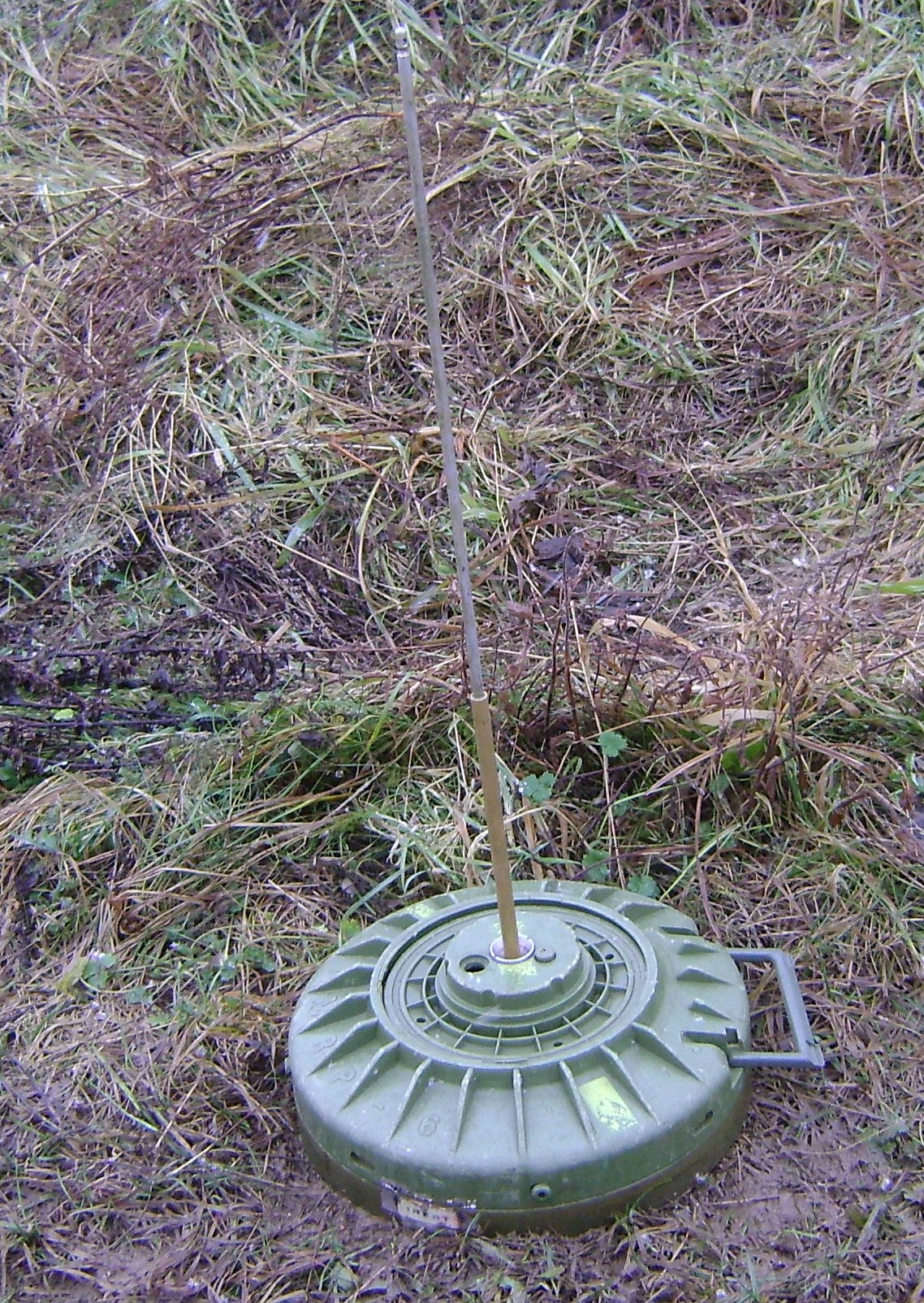
TMRP-6 mine

The TMRP-6 (Serbo-Croatian, Croatian, Bosnian: Protivtenkovska Mina Razorno Probojna -6, Cyrillic script: Противтенковска Мина Разорно Пробојна -6) is a former Yugoslavian anti tank EFP mine.

== History ==
Developed with Swedish assistance (today Dynamit Nobel AG). The EFP disc was originally manufactured in Sweden then license produced in Yugoslavia. It may bear resemblance to the AT2 mine.

== Description ==
External image
- Cross section

The mine is intended for incapacitating and demolition of enemy armoured and other combat and transport vehicles. It has a destructive and penetrating effect. The activation force by a bar is 13–17 N (1.3–1.7 kgf; 2–4 lbf) and by pressure 1500–3500 N (150–350 kgf; 330–780 lbf). Temperature range: −25 °C to +50 °C (–10 °F to +90 °F). It is armed with the pressure lever type mechanical fuse that makes a unit with the mine. The firing pin of the fuse is locked and the explosive chain interrupted, securing safety in storage, transportation and laying. The safety is for one or four minutes. The mine may be laid manually, by means of minelayer, or from helicopter. Arming is automatically done in the ditch. The mine is typically laid in dry or swampy ground. It is airtight and resistant to the action of increased air pressure.

== General information ==
Size: Ø = 290×132 mm (11½×5¼ in). Capable for any type of transportation. Mass of the mine is 7.2 kg. Explosive charge of cast TNT, mass 5.1 kg with tetryl detonator. The mine penetrates an armour to 40 mm at a distance to 80 cm and may act sidewise from a distance of 45 m.

== Mine laying ==
The mine may be laid manually, mechanically and from helicopters. In manual laying. a clod is cut, larger by one half than the mine diameter and a well is dug so that the clod of 2–3 cm is protruding by 2 cm above the ground. The mine is laid in the well, the safety element is taken off, safety is set at 1 or 4 minutes the starter is pressed (the fuze bar is fitted) and the mine camouflaged. The mine is safe for 6 months even under very unfavourable conditions.

== Fuze UTMRP-6 ==
The fuze is mechanical of pressure-lever type, permanently fitted in the mine. It has a clockwork safety, set at 1 or 4 minutes. The basic position is 1 minute. The fuze is activated by a pressure force of 1500 N (330 lbf) or more. The mine may be armed with a supplementary fuze too and may be electrically activated in controlled firing. The fuze may be activated also by action of a bar which Is fitted on the fuze after laying of the mine, with a force of 13–17 N (2–4 lbf). The fuze has an ejection charge of black powder which breaks the weakened part of the mine body, ejecting the top part with tuze, removing the clod and clearing the way to the penetrating disc to obtain a higher penetration.

== Mine clearing ==
The camouflaging layer is removed, the protective plug is unscrewed, the wrench is fitted, interrupting the explosive train and the fuze is set in safe position; the safety element is put on (the haze bar is removed) and the mine is taken out from well.

== Packing ==
Four mines are packed per case: 330×650×330 mm, mass 43 kg (95 lb). Storage capacity -15 years.

== Operators ==
SFR Yugoslavia: passed on to successor states; not exported abroad.
