= Zoukougbeu =

Zoukougbeu Daoungbé
- Town, sub-prefecture and commune
- Location in Ivory Coast
- Coordinates: 6°46′N 6°52′W
- Country: Ivory Coast
- District: Sassandra-Marahoué
- Region: Haut-Sassandra
- Department: Zoukougbeu

Population (2014)
  - Total: 46,195
- Time zone: UTC+0 (GMT)

Zoukougbeu (also known as Daoungbé) is a town in west-central Ivory Coast. It is a sub-prefecture of and the seat of Zoukougbeu Department in Haut-Sassandra Region, Sassandra-Marahoué District. Zoukougbeu is also a commune.

In 2014, the population of the sub-prefecture of Zoukougbeu was 46,195.

== Villages ==
The ten villages of the sub-prefecture of Zoukougbeu and their population in 2014 are:

1. Belle-Ville (18,202)
2. Dohoungbeu (ou Dahoungbeu) (1,659)
3. Garobo (2,795)
4. Mahigbeu (1,361)
5. Nadigbeu (792)
6. Nimé (934)
7. Zahirougbeu (4,867)
8. Zakogbeu 1 (724)
9. Zakogbeu 2 (3,000)
10. Zoukougbeu (11,861)
