= Zoukougbeu Department =

Coordinates: 6°46′N 6°52′W

Zoukougbeu Department Département de Zoukougbeu
- Department
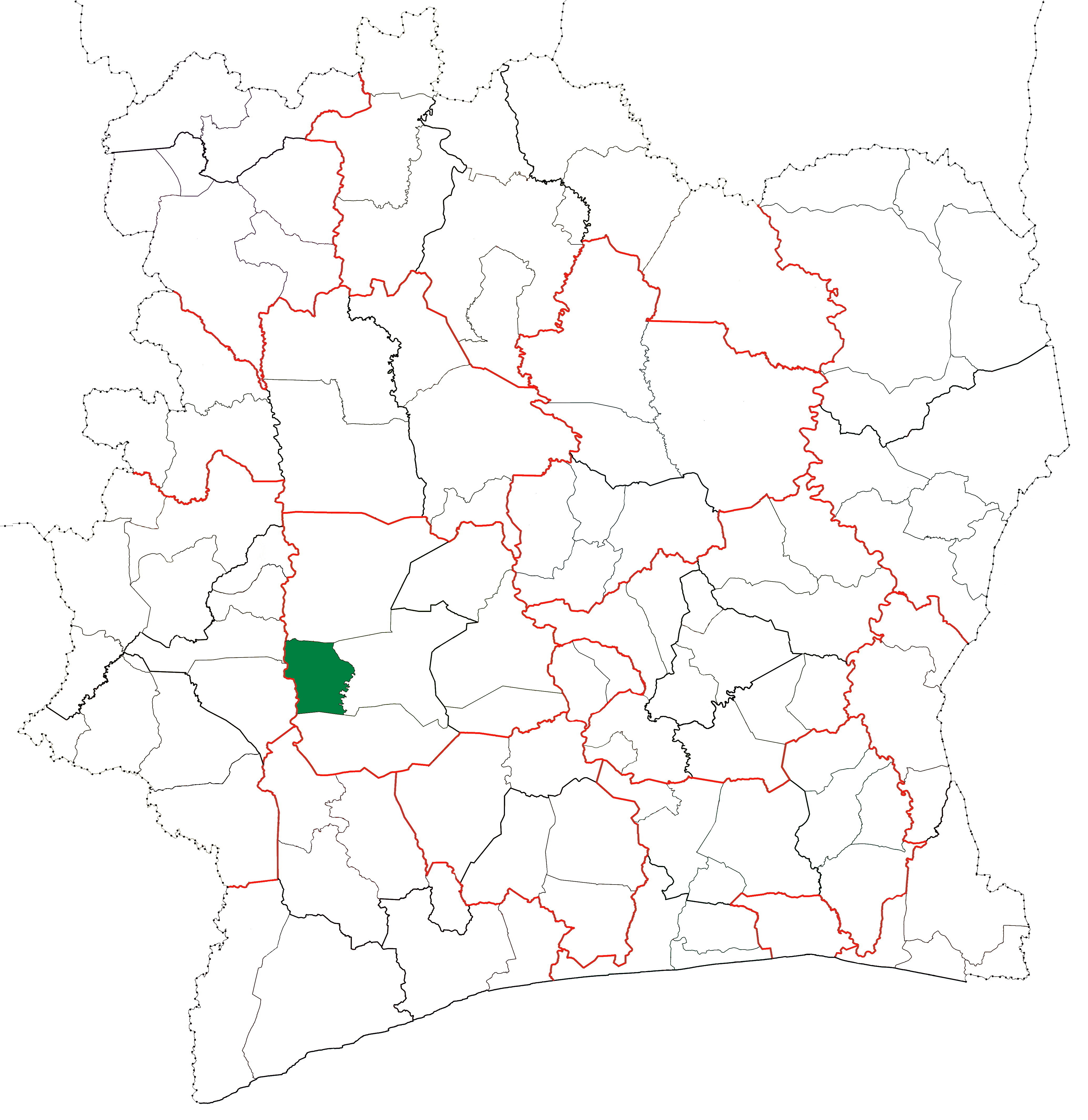
- Location in Ivory Coast. Zoukougbeu Department has retained the same boundaries since its creation in 2008.
- Country: Ivory Coast
- District: Sassandra-Marahoué
- Region: Haut-Sassandra
- 2008: Established as a second-level subdivision via a division of Daloa Dept
- 2011: Converted to a third-level subdivision
- Departmental seat: Zoukougbeu

Government
  - Prefect: Bilé Mariame Kouao

Area
  - Total: 1,580 km^{2} (610 sq mi)

Population (2021 census)
  - Total: 146,537
  - Density: 92.7/km^{2} (240/sq mi)
- Time zone: UTC+0 (GMT)

Zoukougbeu Department is a department of Haut-Sassandra Region in Sassandra-Marahoué District, Ivory Coast. In 2021, its population was 146,537 and its seat is the settlement of Zoukougbeu. The sub-prefectures of the department are Domangbeu, Grégbeu, Guessabo, and Zoukougbeu.

== History ==
Zoukougbeu Department was created in 2008 as a second-level subdivision via a split-off from Daloa Department. At its creation, it was part of Haut-Sassandra Region.

In 2011, districts were introduced as new first-level subdivisions of Ivory Coast. At the same time, regions were reorganised and became second-level subdivisions and all departments were converted into third-level subdivisions. At this time, Zoukougbeu Department remained part of the retained Haut-Sassandra Region in the new Sassandra-Marahoué District.
