= Anti-handling device =

Component of a munition

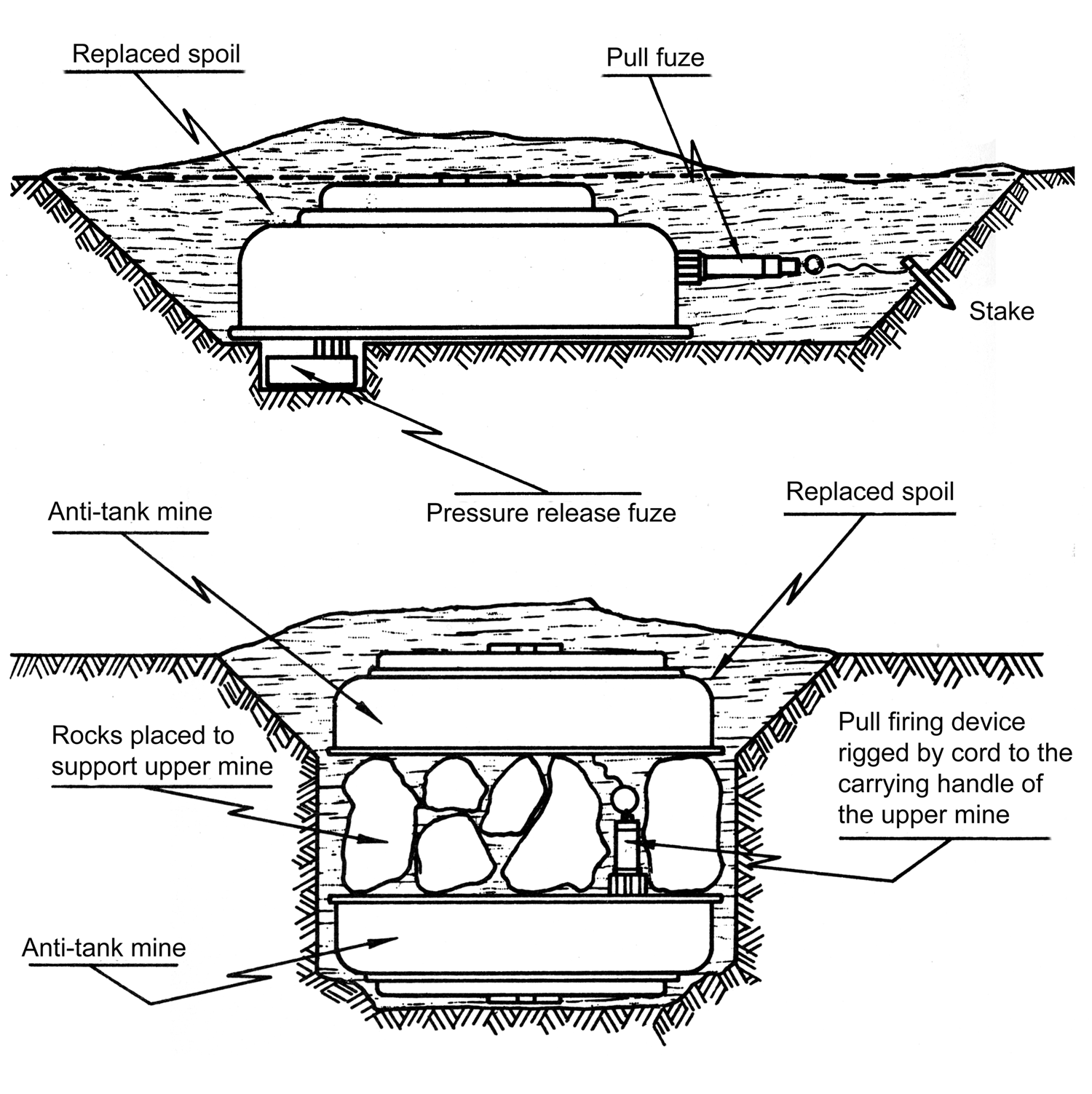
The typical configuration of anti-handling devices used with M15 anti-tank landmines. The upper diagram shows a pull-fuze screwed into a secondary fuze well in the side of the mine. Additionally, an M5 anti-lift device has been screwed into another fuze well, hidden under the mine. An inexperienced deminer might detect and render safe the pull-fuze, but then be killed when they lift the mine, triggering the M5 pressure-release firing device underneath. The lower diagram shows two anti-tank landmines connected by a cord attached to the upper mine's carrying handle. The cord is attached to a pull fuze installed in a secondary fuze well in the bottom mine.

An anti-handling device is an attachment to or an integral part of a landmine or other munition such as some fuze types found in general-purpose air-dropped bombs, cluster bombs and sea mines. It is designed to prevent tampering or disabling, or to target bomb disposal personnel. When the protected device is disturbed, it detonates, killing or injuring anyone within the blast area. There is a strong functional overlap of booby traps and anti-handling devices.

== Purpose ==
Anti-handling devices prevent the capture and reuse of the munition by enemy forces. They also hinder bomb disposal or demining operations, both directly and by deterrence, thereby creating a much more effective hazard or barrier.

Anti-handling devices greatly increase the danger of munitions to civilian populations in the areas in which they are used because their mechanisms are so easily triggered. An anti-tank mine with an anti-handling device fitted is almost guaranteed to detonate if it is lifted/overturned, because it is specifically designed to do so. Munitions fitted with anti-handling devices increase the difficulty and cost of post-conflict clearing operations, due to the inherent dangers of attempting to render them safe.

Not all munitions will have an anti-handling device. Perhaps one in ten antitank mines in a large defensive minefield will have boobytrap firing devices screwed into their secondary fuze wells. Even so, deminers and explosive ordnance disposal (EOD) personnel are forced to assume that all items they encounter may have been boobytrapped, and must therefore take extra precautions. This has the effect of significantly slowing down the clearance process.

== History ==
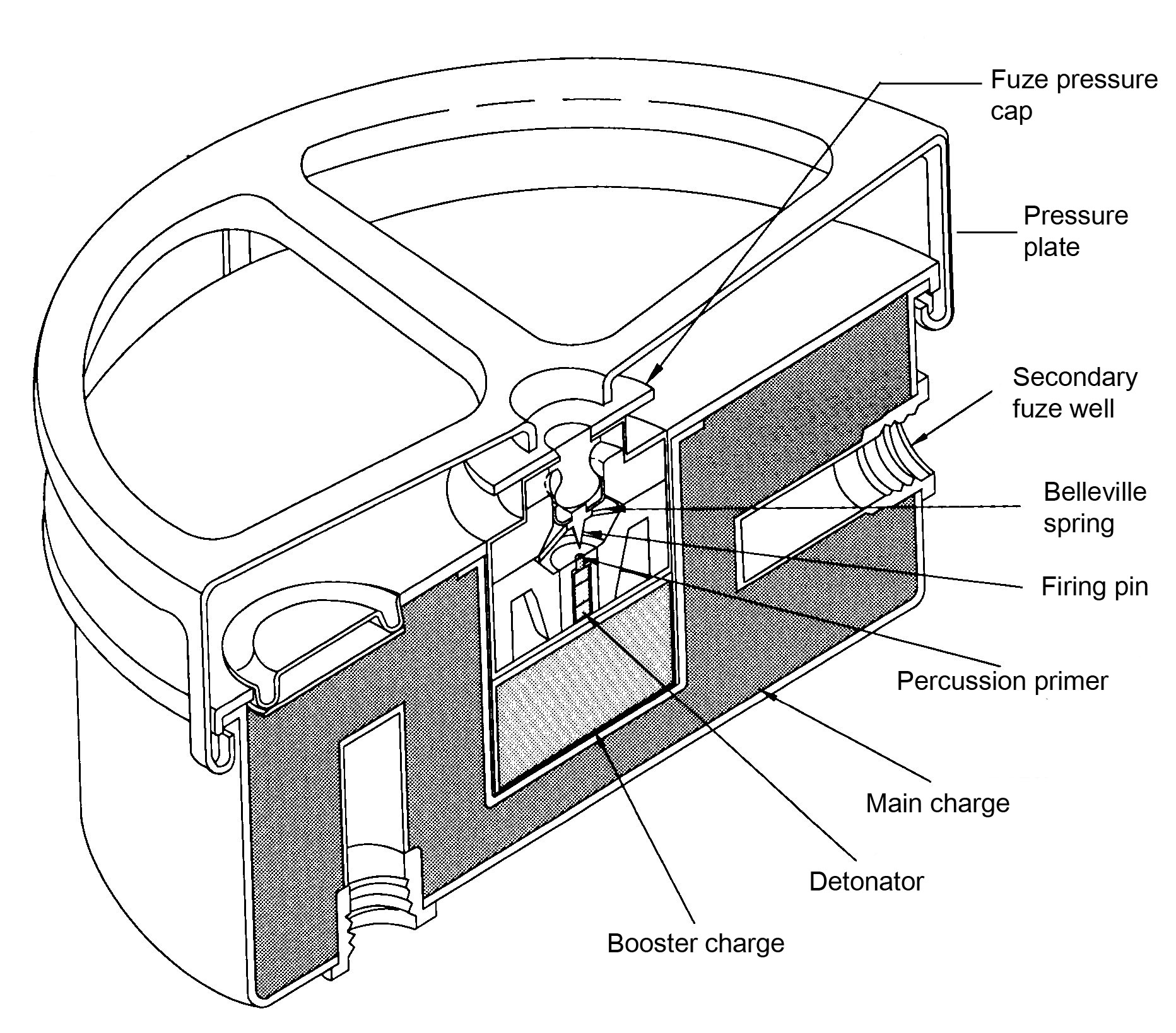
Cutaway view of an M4 anti-tank mine dating from circa 1945, showing two additional fuze wells designed for use with booby-trap firing devices. Either or both fuze wells may have firing devices screwed into them if required

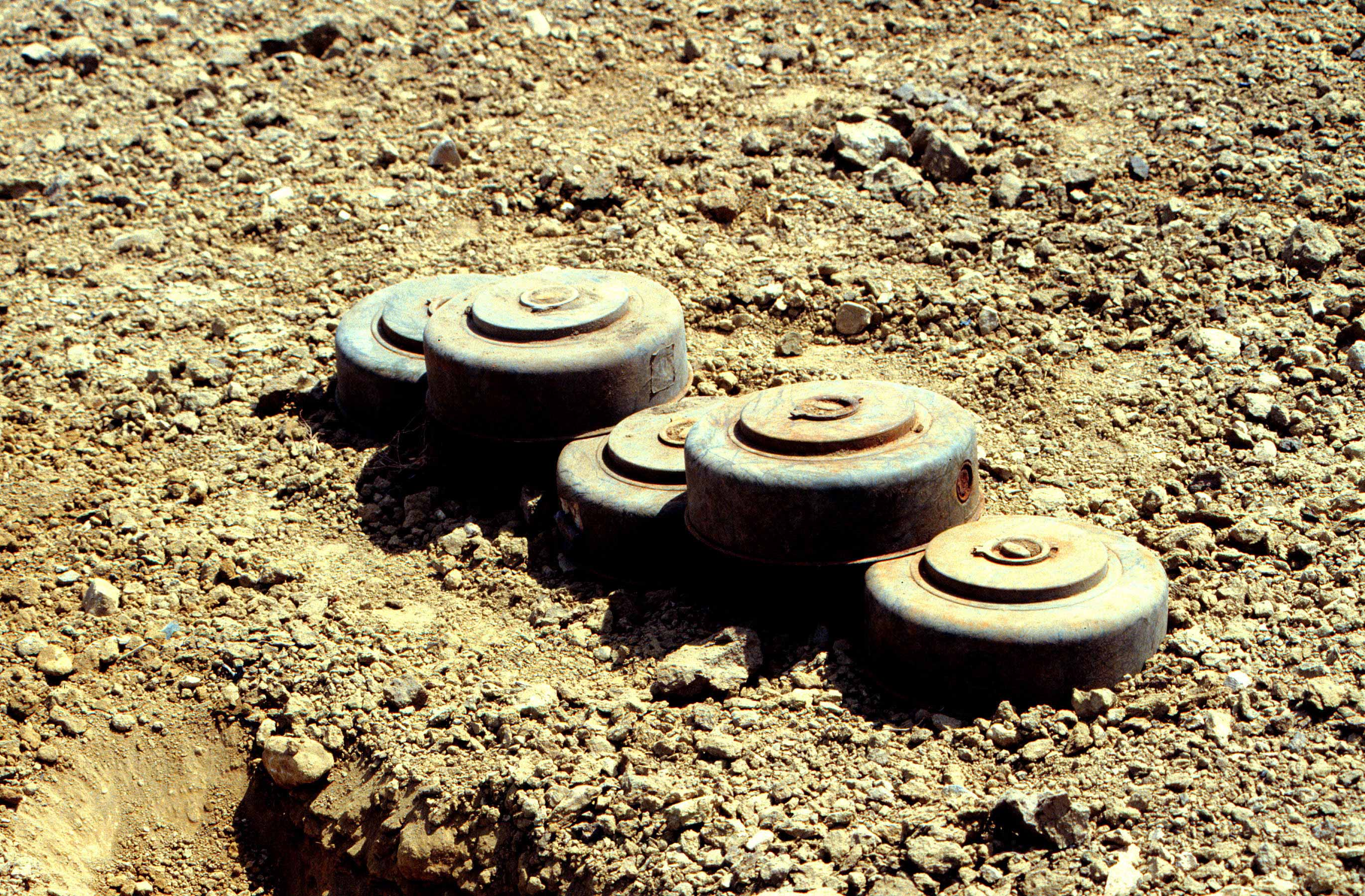
A stack of five M15 mines dating from the 1960s. The top two mines show additional fuze wells

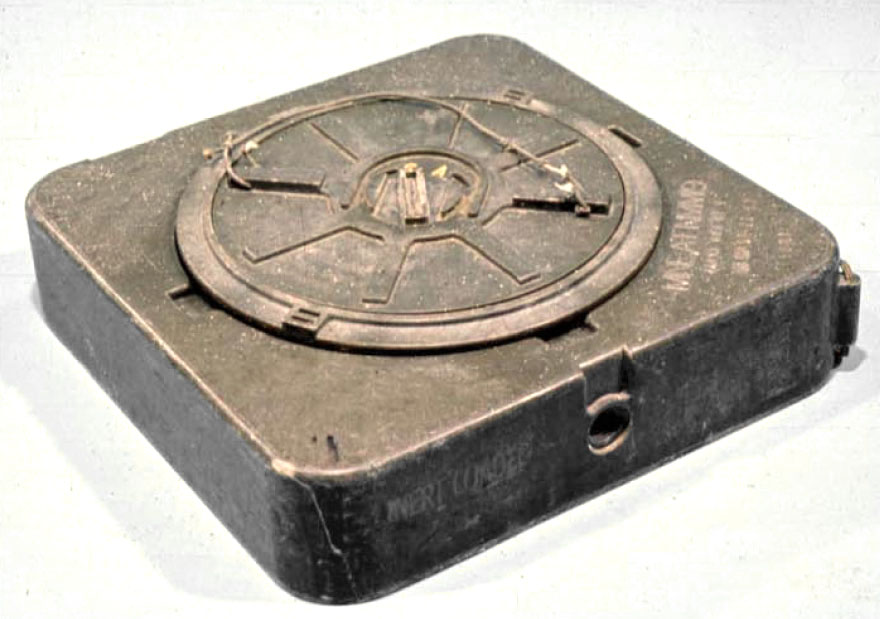
Side view of an M19 anti-tank mine, dating from the 1970s showing an additional fuze well on the side of the mine (sealing cap has been removed) designed for use with booby-trap firing devices. There is another empty fuze well (not visible) located underneath the mine

Anti-handling mechanisms have been used in fuzes since at least 1940, for example, in Luftwaffe's ZUS-40 anti-removal fuze which was used during the London Blitz and elsewhere.

ZUS-40s were designed to fit underneath most Luftwaffe bomb fuzes. When a delayed-action bomb containing a ZUS-40 was dropped on a target, the impact when it hit the ground freed a ball-bearing inside the ZUS-40, thereby arming a spring-loaded firing pin. As long as the main bomb fuze remained inside its fuze well, the cocked firing pin in the ZUS-40 was prevented from springing forward. ZUS-40s were often fitted underneath a type 17 clockwork long delay fuze, which gave between 2 and 72 hours delayed detonation. Rendering safe a type 17 fuze was normally a simple and straightforward process i.e. unscrew the fuze locking ring, remove the fuze from its pocket in the side of the bomb and unscrew the gaine. Fitting a ZUS-40 underneath a type 17 fuze made the render-safe process much more complicated and dangerous. Removing the main time-delay fuze more than 15 millimetres from its fuze pocket (without neutralising the anti-handling device underneath) automatically released the cocked firing pin inside the ZUS-40, which sprang forward to strike a large percussion cap, thereby causing detonation of the bomb and the death of anyone nearby. Because the ZUS-40 was designed to be concealed underneath a conventional bomb fuze, it was very difficult to know whether a particular bomb was fitted with an anti-handling device or not. In any case, many electrically fired German bomb fuzes already had a pendulum-based "trembler" switch which triggered detonation if the bomb was subjected to rough handling.

Some German anti-handling fuzes were even more dangerous to EOD personnel, such as the type 50 and 50BY fuzes. These were normally fitted to 250/500 kg bombs and contained two mercury tilt switches which detected vertical or horizontal movement. The fuzes fully armed themselves approximately 30 seconds after hitting the ground. Subsequently, if the bomb was moved in any way, the mercury switch triggered detonation. To complicate matters still further, German bombs could have two separate fuze pockets fitted, with different fuze types screwed into each one. As a result, one bomb could incorporate two separate anti-handling devices working independently of each other e.g. a type 17 clockwork fuze with a ZUS-40 hidden underneath it screwed into one fuze pocket, and a type 50BY in the other. Even comparatively small air-dropped munitions could incorporate an anti-handling feature e.g. the type 70 fuze fitted to Butterfly bombs. Fuzes with an integral anti-handling feature were not only found in air-dropped bombs. For example, the T.Mi.Z.43 fuze (dating from 1943) fitted to Teller mines automatically triggered detonation if (in an attempt to render the mine safe) the pressure plate was unscrewed. Although the designs of these anti-handling fuzes varied, all were specifically designed to kill bomb disposal personnel who had the task of rendering them safe.

Allied forces developed their own designs of anti-handling devices during World War II. For example, the American M123A1, M124A1, M125 and M131 series of chemical long delay tail-fuzes which were used in air-dropped bombs, starting around late 1942 and remaining in service until the 1960s. Frequently fitted to M30 (100 lb), M57 (250 lb) M64 (500 lb), M65 (1000 lb) and M66 (2000 lb) general-purpose bombs, these fuzes were primarily designed to operate as chemical long-delay fuzes, with the following delay times: 1, 2, 6, 12, 24, 36, 72, and 144 hours. The time delay mechanism was simple but effective: after being dropped from the aircraft a small propeller at the rear of the bomb revolved, gradually screwing a metal rod into the fuze, crushing an ampoule inside it, which contained a solution of alcohol and acetone solvent. When this happened the fuze was fully armed and the timer countdown had started. The alcohol-acetone solution soaked into an absorbent pad next to a celluloid disk which held back a spring-loaded firing pin from a percussion cap connected to an adjacent detonator. Acetone slowly dissolved the celluloid disk, gradually weakening it until the cocked firing pin was released and the bomb detonated. The time delay of the fuze varied according to the acetone concentration and the thickness of the celluloid disk. Removing a chemical long delay fuze from a bomb after it had been dropped would have been a straightforward process had it not been for the fact that there was an integral anti-withdrawal mechanism designed to kill anyone who tried to render the bomb safe. Fuzes such as the M123 (and its derivatives) contained two small ball-bearings at the lower end which slid out of recesses when the fuze was screwed into the bomb by aircraft armorers. The ball-bearings jammed into the screw-threads inside the fuze well, preventing the fuze from being removed. Because the lower end of the fuze was locked in place deep inside the bomb (where access was difficult) this posed major problems for enemy EOD personnel. Attempting to unscrew a fully armed chemical long-delay fuze caused it to split into two separate fuze assemblies. This action automatically triggered detonation by releasing the cocked firing pin in the lower fuze assembly, with lethal results for anyone nearby. In addition to their undoubted value in harassing the enemy, another tactical use of these chemical long delay fuzes was during the first wave of a bombing attack, when most (and occasionally all) of the ordnance dropped on the target would have chemical long delay fuzes fitted, with various time delays. The second wave of bombers arriving a few minutes later would not face problems in identifying targets due to them being obscured by smoke and dust from previous explosions, and therefore could accurately drop bombs with instantaneous fuzes fitted. Meanwhile, the bombs dropped by the first attack wave had already hit their targets and the count-down to detonation was in progress.

Unexploded bombs dating from World War II with chemical long-delay fuzes fitted remain extremely hazardous to EOD personnel. Corrosion makes the fuze mechanism more sensitive to disturbance. There is a high risk that any movement will immediately release the firing pin. Typically, this happens when the bomb is first discovered on a construction site (e.g. accidentally scraping against the bomb with a backhoe), or whilst it is being examined by EOD personnel e.g. gently rotating the bomb casing to gain better access to the rear end. One of these scenarios occurred in June 2010, when an unexploded 500 kilogram allied bomb fitted with a chemical long-delay fuze killed three German EOD personnel and wounded six others in Göttingen, whilst they were preparing to render it safe. Another allied bomb fitted with a chemical long-delay fuze was discovered in Munich during August 2012, and had to be detonated in situ (shattering windows over a wide area and causing major damage to surrounding buildings) because it was considered too dangerous to disarm.

The British "Number 37 Long Delay Pistol" (used by RAF Bomber Command during World War II) was another chemical long delay fuze which used a similar type of anti-removal mechanism. Additionally, an electrically-initiated British nose fuze called the number 845 (Mks 1 and 2) was developed, which operated purely in anti-disturbance mode. The number 845 fuze could be fitted to 250, 500, 1000, and 1,900 pound general purpose bombs. It contained a mercury switch which triggered detonation if the bomb was moved after a 20-second arming delay, which started when the bomb hit the ground.

Since then, many nations have produced a wide variety of munitions with fuzes which incorporate some form of anti-handling function, including very small weapons such as cluster bombs. Alternatively, they have produced munitions with features which make it easy to add an anti-tamper function e.g. extra (but empty) threaded fuze wells on anti-tank landmines, into which the detonators on booby-trap firing devices (plus booster attachments) can be screwed.

== Classes ==
US Army field manual FM 20–32 classifies four classes of anti-handling devices:

- Anti-lifting devices. A device which initiates an explosion when a protected mine is lifted or pulled out of its hole.
- Anti-disturbance device. A device which initiates an explosion when a protected mine is lifted, tilted or disturbed in any way e.g. a notable variant of the VS-50 mine featuring an integral mercury switch.
- Anti-defuzing device. A device which initiates an explosion when an attempt is made to remove a fuze from a protected mine.
- Anti-disarming device. A device which initiates an explosion when an attempt is made to set the arming mechanism of a mine to safe.

== Types of anti-handling fuzes ==
The different classes of anti-handling devices are normally created using a variety of fuzes. This is a list of the types of fuzes used as anti-handling devices:

- Pull fuzes – these are typically installed in secondary fuze wells located on the side or bottom of landmines. The fuze is normally connected to a thin wire attached to the ground, so the wire is automatically pulled if the mine is lifted, shifted or disturbed in any way. Simple pull-fuzes release a spring-loaded striker. More sophisticated versions are electronic i.e. feature a break-wire sensor which detects a drop in voltage. Either way, pulling on the hidden wire triggers detonation.
- Anti-lifting fuzes – these are frequently screwed into an auxiliary fuze pocket located underneath anti-tank landmines. The act of lifting or shifting the mine releases a cocked striker, triggering detonation. The M5 universal firing device is a classic example of an anti-lift fuze. Its standard gauge screw thread allows it to be fitted to various munition types, ranging from an M26 hand grenade up to an M15 antitank landmine.
- Tilt/vibration switches – this is a fuze installed inside the device which triggers detonation if the sensor is tilted beyond a certain angle or is subject to any vibration. Typically, some form of pendulum arrangement, spring-loaded "trembler" or mercury switch is used to detect this.
- Anti-mine detector fuzes – developed during World War II to detect the magnetic field of mine detectors.
- Electronic fuzes – modern electronic fuzes may incorporate anti-handling features. Typically, these fuzes incorporate one or more of the following sensors: seismic, magnetic, light sensitive, thermal or acoustic sensitive. Potentially, such fuzes can discriminate between various types of mine clearance operations i.e. resist activation by devices such as mine flails, plows, or explosives, whilst still detonating when handled by demining personnel. Additionally, electronic fuzes may have an inbuilt self-destruct capability i.e. some form of timer countdown designed to trigger detonation hours, days or even months after deployment, possibly whilst people are attempting to render the device safe. Although fuzes with a self-destruct capability are not anti-handling devices per se, they do add an extra complicating factor to the bomb disposal process.

== See also ==
- Minimum metal mine
- Blast resistant mine
- Booby trap
