= Deadliest Warrior season 2 =

Second season of an American historical weapon reenactment show

Deadliest Warrior
- Season 2
- No. of episodes: 10

Release
- Original network: Spike
- Original release: April 20 – July 27, 2010

Season chronology
- ← Previous; Season 1 Next → Season 3

Season 2 of Deadliest Warrior was announced via Twitter with a teaser image showing a Ballistic Gel torso behind a podium. A teaser video was made available to members of the official fansite, Warrior Den, and previewed some of that season's modern weapons. It premiered April 20, 2010, at 10 pm ET.

== Episode 10: SWAT vs. GSG 9 ==
	SWAT	GSG 9
Team	Jon Darrah (9-year SWAT veteran); Steve Gordon (metro SWAT operator)	Michael Nagel (former German infantryman); Damien Puckler (GSG 9 combat instructor)
Weapons	Benelli M4 Shotgun, LWRC PSD, Remington 700 Sniper Rifle, Taser Shockwave	Remington 870 Shotgun, HK G36, HK PSG1 Sniper Rifle, Stingball Grenade
Armor	Kevlar vest, combat helmet	Kevlar vest, Gefechtshelm M92
Statistics	Warrior: 5'11", 190 pounds Gear: 60 pounds	Warrior: 6'0", 200 pounds Gear: 60 pounds

This episode featured the first four-on-four squad-on-squad battle instead of the traditional five-on-five, and the first not to have melee weapons. SWAT is one of only three warriors to receive the edge in 3 out of 4 weapons match-ups, the others being the Maori Warrior in season 1 and Vlad the Impaler later in the season. The SWAT leader also claimed the most human kills in a four-on-four squad match, with three kills.

Simulation results
	SWAT	Kills	GSG 9	Kills	Notes
Short Range Weapons	Benelli M4 Shotgun	80	Remington 870 Shotgun	81	In the first test, the SWAT team destroyed its six targets in less time. In the second test, the GSG 9 was far more devastating and accurate, destroying the target's head in 17.35 seconds. The Benelli was also accurate, delivering a kill in every shot, and making it in 11.25 seconds, while the Remington 870 had a slower cycle. The advantage went to the SWAT team's Benelli since it finishing their target during both tests in less time.
Mid Range Weapons	LWRC PSD Rifle	227	HK G36	136	Each team ran a simulation where the mission was to rescue a hostage from three enemies, while also securing three bystanders. The GSG 9 experts completed their simulation in 1 minute and 27 seconds and the SWAT team completed the course in 1 minute and 20 seconds. The SWAT's LWRC-PSD utilized higher caliber bullets, and therefore killed with much more damage in less time; earning it the advantage in this category.
Long Range Weapons	Remington 700 Sniper Rifle	271	HK PSG1 Sniper Rifle	205	The SWAT team's Remington 700 destroyed the skull of its target by shooting it through the left eye. The GSG 9's HK PSG1, however, was able to kill its target by shooting it through the right eye, and was more accurate in hitting its target by a fraction of an inch, earning it the advantage in long-ranged weapons.
Special Weapons	Taser Shockwave	0	Stingball Grenade	0	The GSG 9 stingball grenade's rubber balls made numerous indentations on a wall, none of which were judged to be damaging or fatal. The SWAT team's Taser shockwave is composed of 36 Tasers mounted together. At 25 feet, it managed to hit all five targets while only deploying half of its arsenal. During a test of a single Taser, it was able to bring down its live target without causing any significant injury. Since the Taser was accurate and could be used more than once, while stingball grenade carried a risk of collateral damage when deployed, the Taser won the special weapons advantage. The Taser was the first and only weapon on Deadliest Warrior to be tested on a living subject.
Totals		578		422	

Reenactment

The battle begins with the SWAT team's armored van parked near a series of abandoned buildings and parked cars. The squad's captain spots four GSG 9 members approaching from the other side of the area before splitting up. Three of the SWAT members head off in different directions while the leader sets up his Remington 700 sniper rifle. A member of the SWAT team readies a taser shockwave in one warehouse and hides in an adjoining room. A GSG 9 member enters the warehouse, gun in hand, and slowly gets closer to the taser, at which point the SWAT member activates it. The taser shockwave shoots out hooks that latch onto the GSG 9 member and electrically shock him.

A nearby GSG 9 hears the commotion and enters the warehouse, where his teammate is on the floor, dazed. He follows the cord connecting the taser to the remote control into the next room, where the SWAT member tries unsuccessfully to shoot the GSG 9 with his LWRC PSD, but misses and is shot himself with the HK G36. The GSG 9 member then removes the taser hooks from his teammate. The two exit the building but are spotted by the SWAT team captain, who shoots one with the sniper rifle. The other flees onto the roof of a building, where he sets up his HK PSG1 sniper rifle.

Meanwhile, a SWAT team member is chased into a building by two GSG 9 members. He shoots at them from inside with his Benelli M4 shotgun. One of them tries to fire back with his Remington 870 shotgun, but misses, then throws a Stingball Grenade into the room. It explodes, knocking the SWAT member to the floor. The GSG 9 member enters to dispatch him and finds an exit, only to be shot by a SWAT member and his LWRC PSD. That SWAT member is then shot by the GSG 9 member on the roof, who is, in turn, picked off by the SWAT team captain. The captain then runs for cover, with the last GSG 9 member not too far behind. The GSG 9 member slowly approaches the SWAT van with his Remington 870 shotgun but finds the van empty. The SWAT captain, hiding in a parked 4X4 steps out with his Benelli M4, shooting first and killing him.

Winner: SWAT

== Episode 11: Attila the Hun vs. Alexander the Great ==
	Attila the Hun	Alexander the Great
Team	Robert Borsos (mounted weapon specialist); Sean Pennington (ancient combat specialist)	Peter Van Rossum (sword and shield champion); Kendall Wells (bladed weapon specialist); Rashad Evans (former UFC champion)
Weapons	Sword of Mars, lasso, Hunnic composite bow, Scythian axe	Kopis, xyston, gastraphetes, ballista
Armor	Leather lamellar, turban, steel shield	Bronze cuirass, Chalcidian helmet, bronze shield
Statistics	Years active: 406-453 AD; Warrior: 5'6", 145 pounds	Years active: 340-323 BC; Warrior: 5'7", 155 pounds

This episode is the first to factor combat on horseback into a warrior's combat skills and effectiveness. Alexander the Great's team also went through Pankration trials. Rashad Evans was able to easily crush the trachea and fracture the skull of a ballistic gel torso with only his elbow and knee, respectively. The reenactment was the first to feature multiple warriors on each team in an ancient match, rather than the battle being one-on-one.

Simulation results
	Attila the Hun	Kills	Alexander the Great	Kills	Notes
Short Range Weapons	Sword of Mars	117	Kopis	120	When both were tested on horseback (on both stationary and moving targets), the Sword of Mars dealt four killing blows in 34.5 seconds. With the head targets, it caused a decapitation on one meat "neck" and cut through the cervical muscles to the spinal cord on the other. On the slabs of cattle meat, the Sword of Mars managed to slice four inches through the ribs, which are two to three times thicker than human ribs, causing two death blows. The kopis completed the test in 25.75 seconds; it decapitated one meat "neck" and cut through the spinal cord on the other. However, the kopis failed to penetrate the cattle ribs, inflicting a collapsed lung at most. The Sword of Mars received the edge due to killing power.
Mid Range Weapons	Lasso	30	Xyston	225	The xyston was tested against a pig carcass on a zip-line to simulate the weapon's use on horseback. It impaled the pig at 10 feet/second with almost no resistance. The xyston was also tested from horseback on an armoured carcass and was able to puncture through the front plate, impale the carcass through the sternum, and still puncture the back plate. The lasso could cause a hangman's fracture of the neck and crush the trachea, but was still determined to not be a certain kill. The edge was given to the xyston due to its killing power.
Long Range Weapons	Hunnic composite bow	354	Gastraphetes	52	Both were tested on two moving targets. The composite bow was used from horseback, and demonstrated both speed and accuracy. The gastraphetes was tested on foot and could not match the speed or the accuracy of the composite bow. The edge was given to the composite bow. Attila's hunnic composite bow scored the most kills of any pre-gunpowder projectile weapon of the first two seasons.
Special Weapons	Scythian Axe	95	Ballista	7	The ballista was fired at a silhouette target of a mounted Hun at 200 yards, and hit its target at 198 mph. When tested against a formation of enemies, it caused instant kills by impaling them. The scythian axe was tested against an unprotected ballistic gel head, tearing the back of the skull completely open, decapitating the skull, and severing the spinal cord with multiple strikes. The velocity of the scythian axe was measured at 69 mph. However, the axe failed to penetrate Alexander's iron helmet, and could only strike the helmet with roughly 20 pounds of force per square inch; 81 pounds per square inch being the minimum amount of force required to inflict a lethal skull fracture. The edge went to the ballista because of its range and killing power despite having a lower kill count than the axe.
Totals		596		404	

Reenactment 11

The battle begins with two of Alexander's men pushing a ballista towards a ruined city, with Alexander himself behind on horseback. Inside the city, Attila and two men sit, eating a meal, and are made aware of the soldiers approaching when nearby birds fly off, startled by the sound of the ballista being cranked. Alexander's men load and fire the ballista, killing one of the Huns. Attila and his men watch as Alexander, holding a xyston, and his two men, one with a gastraphetes and the other a kopis, run down the small hill toward them. Attila mounts his horse and takes up a bow.

The man with the gastraphetes arrives first, but one of the Huns kills him with his own bow. Alexander charges the Hun with his xyston. Attila draws his bow and fires at Alexander, but the bronze cuirass shatters the arrow. Alexander impales Attila's bowman with the xyston, then catches the lasso Attila throws at him. He pulls Attila off his horse and, after a struggle, Attila does the same to him. Alexander takes the shield off his fallen bowman while Attila rushes him, scythian axe and shield in hand. Alexander knocks Attila's shield from his hands with a kopis.

Attila falls back, avoiding the sword Alexander thrusts at him, before puncturing Alexander's bronze shield with the pick side of the axe. Alexander discards the shield as Attila draws the Sword of Mars. They cross blades, with Attila cutting Alexander's right arm and causing him to drop his kopis. Attila charges Alexander, who throws him to the ground. The two start fighting with their bare hands. Attila spots his sword on the floor and scrambles to retrieve it. Alexander grabs his leg and tries to pull him away from the sword, but Attila kicks him in the face. He tries once again to grab his sword and succeeds. Alexander approaches Attila and is stabbed through the neck.

Winner: Attila the Hun

== Episode 12: Jesse James vs. Al Capone ==
	Jesse James	Al Capone
Team	Joey Dillon (champion gunslinger); J. W. Wiseman (sharpshooting expert)	Meyer Lansky II (Mafioso descendant); Johnny Lew Fratto (Capone authority)
Weapons	Bowie knife, Colt revolvers, Winchester rifle, pistol whip	Stiletto, Tommy gun, pineapple bomb, brass knuckles
Armor	None	
Statistics	Years active: 1866–1876; Members: 4–8; Crimes: Bank robbery and murder	Years active: 1922–1931; Members: 10–20; Crimes: Bootlegging and murder

This was the first modern fight with individual warriors and their men, and the first match-up to feature warriors of the same nationality. This was also the first episode where one weapon (revolvers) is used in two different categories (Mid Range and Special), as well as an attack (pistol-whipping) being listed as a weapon. This is the only episode with two survivors on the winning team in the recreation, as well as the only episode where one of the primary named warriors did not deal the finishing blow. Al Capone is the third warrior to lose despite having the most effective weapon in the fight, which was the Tommy gun.

Simulation results
	Jesse James	Kills	Al Capone	Kills	
Short Range Weapons	Bowie knife	13	Stiletto	1	The stiletto was used to give a ballistics gel torso a "rat's smile", its impact speed measuring at 16.5 fps. The bowie knife was capable of disemboweling a pig carcass; cutting through ribs and exposing the kidneys as well as being able to be thrown. While the impact speed of the bowie knife was also measured, the results were not revealed on the show. Even though the bowie knife caused more damage, the stiletto knife was given the edge because of its concealability and speed. The stiletto is the ninth weapon to be given the edge and score fewer kills than the opposing weapon.
Mid Range Weapons	Colt revolvers	203	Tommy gun	338	The Colt pistols were tested in a recreation of a 19th-century bank, where they expended 12 rounds and made three multiple-hit kills in under seven seconds, with a drawing time of one quarter second. The Tommy gun was also tested on three targets and expended 50 rounds, shooting all three targets in six seconds with two kill shots and a mortal liver wound. The Colt pistols were tested on horseback and the Tommy gun in a 1929 Hudson Super-Six to simulate the vehicles each warrior would have traveled in. The Colt pistols shot three of the five targets, two kill shots and a disarming arm wound. The Tommy gun had identical results. The edge was given to the Tommy gun due to its ability to put more rounds into its targets.
Long Range Weapons	Winchester rifle	326	Pineapple bomb	116	Both the pressure wave and fragmentation of the pineapple bomb were devastating, but it only killed three of its four targets, and had the added disadvantage of a five-second fuse. The Winchester rifle was able to kill all four of its targets in less time than the grenade. The edge was given to the Winchester because of its greater speed, range, and accuracy.
Special Weapons	Pistol whip	2	Brass knuckles	1	The brass knuckles were shown to double the force of a punch from 41 psi to 75 psi. The brass knuckles also managed to fracture a naked skull with one hit and cause a depressed skull fracture in three hits. The pistol whip took only one strike to break through a naked skull with a force of 182 psi, more than double that of the brass knuckles. For this reason, the edge was given to the pistol whip.
Totals		544		456	

Reenactment

Inside an American history museum in Chicago, Jesse James, his brother Frank, and two other gang members break the glass in the Civil War exhibit and arm themselves with Colt revolvers. Meanwhile, Al Capone and three of his men drive up to the museum, intending to see the new exhibit about Old West outlaws. The James brothers and their gangmen take up positions near the door and ambush the Capone gang as they enter. James' team score the first kill in the quick draw showdown. One of Capone's men takes out one of James' men with a Tommy gun, while James' other gangman steals a Winchester rifle to provide cover so the James brothers can retreat further into the museum. They are quickly followed by the Capone gang. One of Capone's men is taken out by the gang member with the Winchester, while another is stabbed from behind by Frank, who emerges from a dark closet with the Bowie knife.

Capone and his last surviving gangster find James and his henchman in an office. James shoots Capone's man with the revolver, catching him off guard, and James' man finishes him off with the Winchester. The rifleman then waits for Capone to make his move, unaware that Capone is pulling the pin from his MK2 "pineapple" grenade. He attempts to shoot Capone as Capone ducks for cover but is killed in the explosion. Capone gets up and tries to steal one of the revolvers, but James shoots it out of Capone's hand. Capone begins to surrender, but James is forced to flee when he discovers both revolvers are out of bullets. Capone puts on his brass knuckles and gives chase, cornering James in the Wild West exhibit's model jail cell. James tries to pistol whip Capone, but Capone blocks the swing and counters with a punch in the gut with the brass knuckles.

Capone begins to brutally beat James and kicks him to the floor. As he draws his stiletto, James gets up with his Bowie knife in hand. Capone goes in for a thrust but James hooks his hand with the stock of the revolver and stabs him in the arm. Capone kicks James as he drops his stiletto, causing James to drop his Bowie. Capone resumes beating James, unaware that Frank James has approaches with the Winchester. He looks up as the gun is cocked and is shot between the eyes.

Winner: Jesse James

== Episode 13: Aztec Jaguar vs. Zande Warrior ==
	Aztec Jaguar	Zande Warrior
Team	David Lavera (Aztec descendant/Martial artist); Éder Saúl López (Aztec combat historian)	Coley Mustafa Speaks (Zande combat specialist); Gordon Jock (Zande weapons expert)
Weapons	Tecpatl, maquahuitl, tlacochtli and atlatl, tematlatl	Makraka, makrigga, kpinga, botto, pima
Armor	Wooden helmet (Cuacalalatli), ichcahuipilli tunic, jaguar skin, Chīmalli shield	Kube shield
Statistics	Year: 1500; Warrior: 5'6", 140 pounds	Year: 1820; Warrior: 5'9", 170 pounds

The Aztec Jaguar is the fourth warrior to lose despite having the most effective weapon in the fight, the maquahuitl.

Simulation results
	Aztec Jaguar	Kills	Zande Warrior	Kills	Notes
Short Range Weapons	Tecpatl	32	Makraka	91	Both weapons were demonstrated as execution weapons. First, the tecpatl demonstrated human sacrifice rituals where the victim's heart was removed; meanwhile, the makraka was used for beheading a bound prisoner. The makraka's precision while beheading the ballistics dummy gave it the edge.
Mid Range Weapons	Maquahuitl	319	Makrigga	289	The maquahuitl sawed-off the head of a ballistic gel horse in three strikes, inflicting tearing wounds, which bleed more, as opposed to cutting wounds. Shards of obsidian were found embedded in the gel, indicating the weapon would continue to cause damage after being retracted. The makrigga was tested on a 300-pound piece of beef filled with animal blood and entrails. The weapon went through the beef, and with the weapon's spiked barbs pulled out entrails when it was pulled out. The maquahuitl was given the edge due to its greater destructive power.
Long Range Weapons	Tlacochtli and Atlatl	86	Kpinga	127	The test demonstrated the kpinga's ability to use angular velocity by doing vertical throws at a crowd of warriors, one armed with a shield. The kpinga maneuvered and deflected off the enemy shield and struck another target. The weapon was then tested using a horizontal toss to cut through pork leg stand-ins. For the Jaguars, the atlatl and tlacochtli were found to be capable of hitting targets at great distances and of piercing the Zande shield to kill its target. However, the kpinga proved to have more killing potential with multiple blades on the weapon; giving it the edge.
Special Weapons	Tematlatl	11	Botto & pima	45	The tematlatl was tested on skulls, hitting only three of five. Some of the hits were not fatal. The botto and pima did not fare well either. Despite the arrows being poison-tipped, they could not penetrate the Jaguar's cotton armor, preventing the poison from taking effect. The edge was ultimately given to the tematlatl due to the weapon having better odds of killing its target.
Totals		448		552	

Reenactment

At the top of a rocky hill, the Zande Warrior yells out a battle cry, which prompts the Aztec Jaguar to raise his tlacochtli and atlatl. He hurls the tlacochtli, which narrowly misses the Zande Warrior. He tries again, succeeding in hitting the Zande's shield. The Zande Warrior removes the arrow from the shield and puts his makrigga spear on the ground. He pulls out his botto and pima and climbs down the hill to run towards the Aztec Jaguar. The Jaguar sets up another tlacochtli and throws it, missing the Zande Warrior again. He fires an arrow in retaliation and hits the Aztec Jaguar in the chest, but the arrow does not penetrate the cotton armor.

The Jaguar climbs down from his hill and prepares his tematlatl, which misses the Zande Warrior. The Zande Warrior pulls out a kpinga and throws it at the Aztec Jaguar, striking his leg and forcing him to the ground. The Jaguar begins to flee, stopping to retrieve his maquahuitl, which he had left by a rock on the climb up. He manages to cut through the Zande's shield with it, surprising the warrior and knocking off his headdress. He slashes the Zande's chest on the third swing. The Zande Warrior pulls out his makraka and knocks the maquahuitl out of the Aztec's hands. He swings the makraka at him, but it gets lodged in the Aztec's helmet. As he struggles to free his weapon, the Aztec Jaguar slashes across the Zande's hip with his tecpatl knife. The Zande Warrior falls to the ground in pain and begins rolling down the hill.

The Aztec Jaguar removes his helmet, picks up his maquahuitl and begins chasing the Zande Warrior, who is now back on his feet. The Zande Warrior rushes back to the top of his hill to the makrigga spear he put down earlier. The Aztec Warrior catches up and prepares to swing his maquahuitl, but the Zande Warrior quickly turns around and thrusts the makrigga into his stomach. The Aztec falls back and off the hill, dropping into the field below.

Winner: Zande Warrior

== Episode 14: Nazi Waffen SS vs. Viet Cong ==
	Nazi Waffen SS	Viet Cong
Team	Silvio Wolf Busch (former German Military); Robert Wilhelm-McCain (German military historian)	Tuan Nguyen (Vietnam War survivor); Danny Boyer (Viet Cong weapons expert)
Weapons	Mauser C-96 pistol, MP 28, Bouncing Betty, Flammenwerfer 41	Tokarev TT-33 pistol, MAT-49, POMZ-2 and F-1 grenade, punji stakes
Armor	M-35 Steel Helmet (camouflaged)	None
Statistics	Reign of Terror: 1933-1945; Warrior: 6'0", 175 pounds	Reign of Terror: 1954–1976; Warrior: 5'4", 120 pounds

This is the first match-up where every tested weapon killed someone in the final battle. Despite the fact that they were not included in the weapons testing, rifles were used by both squads during the simulation (possibly the K98k and SKS). This is the only match up not to feature mid-range weapons; the second to not have melee weapons; and the fifth episode to have a tie in the weapons edges.

Simulation results
	Nazi Waffen SS	Kills	Viet Cong	Kills	Notes
Short Range Weapons	Mauser C-96 pistol	50	Tokarev TT-33 pistol	42	The pistols were tested in eliminating five targets. The TT-33 finished in 24 seconds with eight shots, while the C-96 finished in 12 seconds with ten shots. The Mauser C-96's automatic fire capability was then demonstrated, emptying a full magazine in less than a second. The edge was given to the Mauser C-96 for its 20-round capacity and secondary autofire option.
Long Range Weapons	MP 28	310	MAT-49	177	It was determined that both SMGs performed almost equally in eliminating three targets in 30 seconds, resulting in a draw.
Explosive Weapons	Bouncing Betty	76	POMZ-2 and F-1 grenade	81	The Bouncing Betty destroyed four targets and had an effective fragmentation radius of 15 yards, while the F-1 grenade decimated a pig carcass after its POMZ-2 host mine had been disarmed and removed. The edge was given to the F-1 Grenade and POMZ-2 combination due to its anti-handling nature.
Special Weapons	Flammenwerfer 41	178	Punji stakes	86	The Flammenwerfer 41 eliminated a group of targets and burned down a hut in the span of a few seconds. The punji pit trap could kill by infection if the victim did not fall in facefirst, while the punji spike ball trap could penetrate deep enough to hit vital organs. The edge was given to the Flammenwerfer 41, since it did not require its victims to fall in or activate a trip wire to be effective, and was capable of clearing out areas and neutralizing booby traps, thus preventing any form of surprise attacks.
Totals		614		386	

Reenactment

The battle begins with Viet Cong members bringing in the beaten leader of the Nazi Waffen SS team as a prisoner. Outside the camp, the rest of the SS team sneaks up, setting up a Bouncing Betty along the way. The Viet Cong beat and threaten the SS leader. As the Viet Cong leader prepares to execute him with his Tokarev, the rest of the Waffen SS squad begins firing at the camp with MP 28 submachine guns and bolt-action rifles. One VC is killed while the leader takes cover and the other two grab their weapons. The Waffen SS leader manages to get free and escapes into the jungle. A Nazi soldier is killed by a VC with a MAT-49 submachine gun. The Nazis fall back into the jungle to regroup and the rest of the Viet Cong gives chase.

One of the Nazis gives his leader a Mauser C-96 pistol. The soldier continues through the jungle, but falls into a punji stake pit, which kills him. In another area, two more Viet Cong catch up to two SS soldiers. One of the VC is killed by the planted Bouncing Betty. As the two Waffen SS try to cross the river, one trips a wire and activates the POMZ-2 mine, which kills him. The other Nazi jumps across the river and kills a VC soldier with his MP 28. Meanwhile, the Nazi leader kills one of the two remaining Viet Cong members with his Mauser pistol and escapes. The other Nazi soldier sees the VC leader try to follow and attempts to kill him with his MP 28, but runs out of ammo and is shot dead by the Viet Cong leader's Tokarev.

The two remaining leaders exchange fire with their pistols until both guns are depleted. The Waffen SS leader then finds his team's Kubelwagen and runs to it, finding a Flammenwerfer 41 in the back. While the Viet Cong leader is loading a fresh magazine into his gun, the Nazi ducks for cover behind the car and straps on the flamethrower. When the VC leader begins to fire at him, the Waffen SS leader jumps out from behind the car and shoots a burst of fire at him, setting him alight and killing him.

Winner: Nazi Waffen SS

== Episode 15: Roman Centurion vs. Rajput Warrior ==
	Roman Centurion	Rajput Warrior
Team	Terence Rotolo (ancient combat specialist); Matt Lasky (Roman weapons historian)	Gugun Deep Singh (Rajput descendant/weapons expert); Bhajneet Singh (Gatka martial artist); Sukhwinder Singh (aara expert)
Weapons	Gladius, pilum, scorpion, dolabra	Khanda, aara, chakram, katar
Armor	Lorica hamata, galea, scutum	Coat of 10,000 Nails, steel helmet, steel shield
Statistics	Year: 120 AD; Warrior: 5'8", 170 pounds	Year: 900 AD; Warrior: 5'6", 145 Pounds

Simulation results
	Roman Centurion	Kills	Rajput Warrior	Kills	Notes
Short Range Weapons	Gladius	223	Khanda	328	The gladius was capable of chopping off arms (cutting cleanly through the bone), stabbing through the liver and through a rib and into the lung, and through a clavicle, while the khanda cut through five ribs on one cattle carcass, through the spine and through both sides of the ribcage on the second, and through the femur on the third. The edge was given to the khanda for its tremendous cutting power and longer blade.
Mid Range Weapons	Pilum	44	Aara	0	The aara, when wielded against three targets, was only able to kill one and inflict minor injuries on the other two. The pilum, however, penetrated three blood bags and one Rajput shield. The edge was given to the pilum for its flexible killing potential as a spear and a throwing projectile. The aara was the sixth weapon to score no kills in the simulation.
Long Range Weapons	Scorpion	4	Chakram	53	The chakram severed a simulated neck while the scorpion delivered four kills at 25 yards and one kill at 50 yards. The edge was given to the chakram for its portability and faster rate of fire.
Special Weapons	Dolabra	114	Katar	234	The katar impaled a suspended pig carcass with multiple punches which were measured at over 200 pounds of force. It both fractured and cut through the carcass's ribs, and a final blow completely disemboweled the carcass. On a second carcass clad in lorica hamata, the katars punctured it with four punches, the lorica hamata offering only slightly more protection. The dolabra was tested against a ballistics gel torso wearing a coat of 10000 nails. The dolabra's axe-end shattered the left arm bone, ripped through the biceps and the triceps, and severed the brachial artery. It also severed the top half of the skull in one blow and almost severed the right arm. The pick-end was used to puncture the coat twice, breaking a rib and puncturing the heart. Although both weapons were capable of penetrating butted chainmail and delivering killing blows, the edge was given to the dolabra for its longer reach.
Totals		385		615	

Reenactment

The battle starts with a Rajput Warrior walking through a forest, investigating a clicking noise that turns out to be the Roman Centurion cranking the lever on his scorpion. As the Rajput warrior gets closer, the Centurion loads a bolt into the scorpion. He fires when the Rajput looks around a tree, but misses. He then pulls out his pilum javelin and charges, causing the Rajput to flee. The Centurion moves to a more open area but is met with one of the Rajput's chakram discs. The Centurion blocks the chakram with his shield, then throws his pilum. The Rajput, however, pulls out his khanda and slices the javelin in two.

The Rajput pulls out his aara and whips it around, and the Centurion charges at the Rajput with his dolabra. The Centurion blocks a strike from the aara with his shield, then lunges at the Rajput with his dolabra. The Rajput jumps out of the way, then swings his aara and coils it around the Centurion's leg, pulling him to the ground. The Centurion kicks a log at the Rajput, tripping him, and is able to get back to his feet. The Centurion swings at the Rajput, who, while moving back to avoid it, falls backwards onto a giant log. The Centurion swings his dolabra but the Rajput rolls out of the way and the dolabra gets stuck in the log.

The Rajput swings his khanda and cuts the head of the dolabra off at the handle. The Centurion swings the broken handle fast enough to hit the Rajput and knock him over. He then pulls out his gladius and swings wildly at the Rajput, eventually knocking the khanda out of his hands. He slashes the Rajput's face and forces him to the ground. He raises his sword and prepares to finish him off, but the Rajput stabs the Centurion in the stomach with his katar. He falls to the ground in pain and the Rajput finishes him off with the khanda.

Winner: Rajput Warrior

== Episode 16: Somali Pirates vs. Medellín Cartel ==
	Somali Pirate	Medellín Cartel
Team	Abdi Ali (Somali native/army veteran); Haji Ukajh (Somali refugee/weapons expert)	Michael Corleone Blanco (son of Medellín Cartel boss); Kenny "Kenji" Gallo (former cocaine smuggler)
Weapons	Grappling hook, AK-47, PKM machine gun, RPG-7	Machete, mini Uzi, M60 machine gun, car bomb
Armor	None	
Statistics	Reign of Terror: 1992–Present; Warrior: 5'10", 145 Pounds; Crimes: Vessel hijacking	Reign of Terror: 1975–1993; Warrior: 5'9", 175 pounds Crimes: Cocaine trafficking

The Somali Pirates are the sixth of thirteen warriors to win after scoring more kills at mid range and long range. The reenactment is the first battle where a combatant eliminates himself and an opponent in a suicide move.

Simulation results
	Somali Pirates	Kills	Medellin Cartel	Kills	Notes
Short Range Weapons	Grappling hook	8	Machete	54	The machete cleaved off the arms, severed the throat, and carved a Colombian necktie on a gel torso, while the grappling hook ripped into a pig carcass. The edge was given to the machete since the grappling hook was not designed to be a weapon and can cause damage to the user.
Mid Range Weapons	AK-47	204	Mini Uzi	188	The mini Uzi emptied an entire magazine into two targets inside a car with most of the hits being in the head and neck areas, while the AK-47 killed two targets at 50 yards and two targets at 100 yards while fired from a small skiff. The edge was given to the AK-47 for its longer range and firepower.
Long Range Weapons	PKM Machine Gun	140	M60 machine gun	96	The PKM eliminated four targets in 1 minute and 43 seconds, but jammed once, while the M60 took 1 minute and 54 seconds and jammed twice. The edge was given to the PKM for its higher rate of fire and better mechanical reliability.
Explosive Weapons	RPG-7	170	Car bomb	140	Although the RPG-7 was portable and could be fired repeatedly at a distance, the edge was given to the car bomb for its better chance at killing multiple targets with its larger explosive payload.
Totals		522		478	

Reenactment

Inside a warehouse, Pablo Escobar and one of the Medellín Drug Cartel thugs are preparing packages of cocaine. Nearby, a third member practices swinging his machete and a fourth dances to salsa music while holding an M60 machine gun. Outside, a group of Somali Pirates dock their motorboat at the pier and swarm onto shore towards the warehouse. The head Pirate, armed with an AK-47, and two of his men, armed with a PKM machine gun and grappling hook, respectively, enter the warehouse while a fourth stays behind, shouldering his RPG-7 rocket launcher.

Inside, one Pirate uses his machine gun to kill the thug packing cocaine. Escobar grabs an Uzi while the dancing thug fires his M60. The thug with the machete tries to sneak up on one of the Somali Pirates but the Pirate with the grappling hook spots him as he charges. They fight, with the thug sustaining a hit to the stomach and the Pirate losing a hand. The thug slashes his neck, killing him. The lead Pirate hears the commotion and shoots the Cartel member dead with his AK-47. The other Cartel thug continues to fire his M60, but it gets jammed. He drops it and picks up an Uzi before he and Escobar try to escape. A Pirate shoots his PKM at Escobar, but misses. The Pirate leader chases Escobar down the stairs and they exchange gunfire. Escobar is shot in the shoulder and falls to the floor, where he lies, motionless.

Meanwhile, the other Cartel thug ambushes a Somali Pirate, killing him with his Uzi. Downstairs, the Pirate leader climbs into the driver's seat of a car full of cocaine and money. Behind the car, Escobar is still alive but has sustained serious wounds. With his remaining strength, he detonates a bomb underneath the car, killing both the head Pirate and himself. The remaining Cartel member attempts to flee the building but is killed by the Pirate with the rocket launcher, who has remained outside.

Winner: Somali Pirates

== Episode 17: Persian Immortal vs. Celt ==
	Persian Immortal	Celt
Team	Ardeshir Radpour (Persian historian/equestrian); Cyrus Zahiri (Persian sword master)	Francis Brebner (Highland Games champion); Spencer Dinnean (Celtic warrior descendant); Dave Baker (blade master)
Weapons	Sagaris, spear, bow and arrow, chariot scythe	Longsword, lancea, sling, burda
Armor	Bronze scale, wicker shield	Leather belt, wooden shield
Statistics	Year: 500 BC; Warrior: 5'8", 160 pounds	Year: 400 BC; Warrior: 6'0", 180 pounds

The simulation had the most lopsided (689–311) results of Season 2 and is first where the warrior's performance was affected by chariot. The Persian Immortal is one of three warriors to get at least 100 kills with each weapon, and is the seventh warrior of fourteen who won after scoring more kills at mid range and long range.

Simulation results
	Persian Immortal	Kills	Celt	Kills	Notes
Short Range Weapons	Sagaris	127	Longsword	170	The longsword decapitated a gel torso in three hits at 74 mph, breaking through the spinal cord on the first swing and through the cheekbone on the second swing. Tested against the Persian Immortal's armor, the longsword struck off metal scales with a force of 280 psi, enough to break a rib behind the armor. It cut a gel head through the nose and to the brain from the back of a chariot. The pick-end of the sagaris penetrated a ballistics gel torso multiple times, visually breaking through several ribs and puncturing the heart enough to cause a very rapid bleed-out. The sagaris also punctured part of the upper intestine, causing a septic death. When tested against a dummy wearing Celtic armor, the sagaris was used as a fulcrum to pull away the shield, then used to puncture the helmet with the pick-end with a force of over 323 psi. It also stabbed the naked torso and punctured the leather belt, though only managed to inflict a flesh wound beneath the belt and took several seconds to be removed. The edge was given to the long sword for its faster recovery time.
Mid Range Weapons	Spear	247	Lancea	126	The lancea went through a pig carcass when it was thrown as a javelin. The Persian spear stabbed and killed two human-shaped targets from the back of a chariot, the first in the nape of the neck, piercing the carotid artery and the jugular vein; and the second target directly in the heart. The second target was also dragged behind the chariot for several feet. The edge was given to the spear since it was not a disposable missile weapon, like the lancea, and had a thinner tip to facilitate deeper penetration.
Long Range Weapons	Bow and arrow	180	Sling	1	The bow and arrow's effective range was 50 yards, while the sling delivered two kills and three wounds with five shots. The edge was given to the bow and arrow for its superior range, accuracy, rate of fire, and lethality.
Special Weapons	Chariot scythe	135	Burda	14	The burda club exploded seven heads at roughly 273 psi, while the chariot scythe failed to kill either of its two pig targets. The edge was given to the burda for its simplicity and portability.
Totals		689		311	

Reenactment

The battle begins in an open field with the Persian Immortal and Celt in their own chariots, each with its own charioteer. They advance. The Immortal fires an arrow and hits the Celt's charioteer in his chest. His chariot closes in and breaks one of the Celt's chariot wheels with a chariot scythe. The collision throws the Celt off of his chariot and flips the chariot over. The Celt grabs his lancea from the fallen vehicle but abandons his shield, then charges at the Persian chariot. The Persian fires another arrow, but misses. As he readies another arrow, the Celt throws his lancea. It misses, but it distracts the Immortal and prevents him from getting a clear shot, allowing the Celt to put distance between them.

Across the field, the Celt abandons his lancea in favor of his sling. The Immortal jumps off his chariot with his spear and shield just before the Celt throws a rock with his sling. The rock hits the Persian charioteer and knocks him unconscious. The Immortal runs towards the Celt, but the Celt thrusts his lancea, knocking his spear out of the Immortal's hand. Unable to retreat, the Immortal draws his sagaris axe and a scuffle ensues. Neither are able to land a successful blow until the Celt stabs the Immortal in the thigh. The Immortal swings his axe, forcing the Celt to withdraw his lancea. The Celt blocks his overhand swing, but the Immortal manages to kick him to the ground. The Celt gets back up and draws his longsword and burda. He distracts the Immortal with the longsword, then hits him with the club.

The Immortal blocks the longsword with his sagaris, managing to avoid the next swing and piercing the Celt's arm. The Celt hits the sagaris out of the Immortal's hand and leaves him without a weapon. The Immortal retreats and the Celt follows, dropping the burda from his wounded arm. The Immortal finds his spear laying on the ground and thrusts it at the Celt, missing twice. The Celt tries to swing the sword downward, but the Immortal flips the spear over and hits him in the head with the iron counterweight on the bottom. The Immortal stabs the Celt in the chest and through the leather armor, forcing the Celt to the floor and killing him.

Winner: Persian Immortal

== Episode 18: K.G.B. vs. C.I.A. ==
	K.G.B.	C.I.A.
Team	Pavel Ksendz (K.G.B. operator descendant); Stass Klassen (former Russian Military)	Mike Baker (former C.I.A. agent); Frank Dowse (former defense intelligence)
Weapons	Shoe knife, camera gun, Skorpion SMG-61, Dead Drop Spike	Garrote, briefcase gun, MAC-10, exploding cigar
Armor	None	
Statistics	Years active: 1954–1991; Warrior: 5'10", 170 pounds Missions: Espionage and sabotage	Years active: 1947–Present; Warrior: 5'11", 180 pounds Missions: Covert and paramilitary ops

This is the first and only episode where every combatant in the final battle has an identity (albeit secret), as well as the first battle to have female combatants. The female K.G.B. agent earned 2 kills, making her the first female on the show to kill in the simulation.

Simulation results
	K.G.B.	Kills	C.I.A.	Kills	Notes
Short Range Weapons	Shoe knife	5	Garrote	1	The force of a kick with the shoe knife was measured at 605 psi, ripping through a pig carcass. The garrote decapitated a gel torso but was determined to be heavily dependent on a surprise attack from behind. The edge was given to the shoe knife since it was more flexible and less disadvantaged than the garrote.
Mid Range Weapons	Camera gun	10	Briefcase gun	95	The briefcase gun killed a target with a lethal shot to the liver while the camera gun achieved an instant kill by driving a .22 bullet through the left nostril of a gel head. The edge was given to the briefcase gun since it contained a 9mm PPK which was a heavier caliber and longer range weapon that could be fired multiple times.
Long Range Weapons	Skorpion SMG-61	361	MAC-10	413	Against five targets, the Skorpion delivered three kills but left one wounded and one alive in 12 seconds, while the MAC-10 delivered five kills in 20 seconds. The edge was given to the MAC-10 for its heavier caliber, 30-round magazine, faster rate of fire, and better accuracy.
Explosive Weapons	Dead Drop Spike	74	Exploding cigar	41	The cigar completely destroyed the upper and lower jaw of a gel head but was determined to be very unreliable due to its timed fuse and small explosive payload, while the explosive trap concealed in the dead drop spike decimated a mannequin. The edge was given to the dead drop spike for its higher success rate at killing a target with its semtex payload and tamper-proof trigger.
Totals		450		550	

Reenactment

A K.G.B. agent follows a C.I.A. agent into a USSR Embassy while another C.I.A. agent watches from a nearby van. Inside an office, the C.I.A. agent conducts a business transaction with another K.G.B. officer, a double agent who trades him a roll of camera film for a briefcase full of U.S. currency. To seal the deal, the C.I.A. agent offers him a cigar, which explodes on his last puff, killing him. The C.I.A. agent takes the film and the briefcase and leaves the office. In the lobby, two more K.G.B. agents are shooting a film with a camera, while another C.I.A. agent sits nearby with a briefcase. One of the K.G.B. turns the camera on the C.I.A. agent leaving the office, shooting him dead at point-blank range. The other C.I.A. agent immediately kills him using his briefcase gun, but is quickly taken out by the remaining K.G.B. member with her silenced Skorpion sub-machine gun. She then steals the film off the other agent's body.

Two more C.I.A. agents storm the lobby with silenced MAC-10s and the K.G.B. takes cover in an elevator, which closes behind her. She drops the film into a Dead Drop Spike. When the doors open, she meets the K.G.B. officer who had been tailing the C.I.A. agent into the Embassy, and passes off the film. They are escaping through a kitchen when the C.I.A. agents from the lobby open fire on them, wounding one of the K.G.B. The gunfire continues and the uninjured K.G.B. agent kills the female C.I.A. agent before being killed with a short burst of machine gun fire. The remaining agent follows the uninjured K.G.B. into a restroom, where they scuffle. The K.G.B. unsheathes a shoe knife, but the C.I.A. agent manages to shoot him in the stomach with the MAC-10, killing him. He retrieves the Dead Drop Spike but fails to open it correctly and is blown up.

Outside, the C.I.A. agent in the van watches a fifth K.G.B. agent, who gets out of his car with a Skorpion in his coat when he hears the explosion. While he is distracted by the carnage inside, the C.I.A. officer hides in the backseat of the K.G.B.'s car. When he returns, the C.I.A. strangles him to death from behind with a garrote wire.

Winner: C.I.A.

== Episode 19: Vlad the Impaler vs. Sun Tzu ==
	Vlad the Impaler	Sun Tzu
Team	Vaclav Havlik (medieval sword master); Brahm Gallagher (Vlad historian)	Johnny Yang (Chinese martial arts champ); Tommy Leng (ancient Chinese weapons expert)
Weapons	Kilij, halberd, steel crossbow, hand cannon	Jian, zhua, repeating crossbow, flaming arrows
Armor	Plated mail, steel helmet, steel shield, steel plates	Leather lamellar, shield, bronze helmet
Statistics	Years active: 1431-1476; Warrior: 5'9", 170 pounds	Years active: 544-496 BC; Warrior: 5'7", 160 pounds

This matchup is the most lopsided time-wise, with Sun Tzu traditionally believed to have been alive between 544 and 496 BC (during the Bronze Age), and Vlad III between 1431 and 1476 AD (during the Middle Ages), a difference of 1,927 years between Sun Tzu's death and Vlad's birth. Vlad's method of impalement was demonstrated on a gel dummy. The stake was inserting through the posterior and, as gravity carried the body downward, it pierced the lung and all major blood vessels in the torso before breaking the clavicle and exiting through the shoulder. Vlad was the first of two warriors who killed using non-factored methods in the simulation.

Simulation results
	Vlad the Impaler	Kills	Sun Tzu	Kills	Notes
Short Range Weapons	Kilij	337	Jian	234	The kilij cleanly sliced through a pig carcass with all of its four swings, while the rapier-like jian cleanly pierced through and cut up another pig carcass, piercing the aorta, and severing bone. The edge was given to the kilij for its devastating cutting power.
Mid Range Weapons	Halberd	214	Zhua	37	The zhua (a solid iron pole with a claw) tore apart a gel head in three strikes, causing a depressed fracture in every bone in the face. The halberd pierced and ripped through the bones on a side of beef with the axe, hook, and pike portions of the blade, including severing 6 inches into the thickest part of the femur and piercing to the spinal cord. The edge was given to the halberd for its killing power and the flexibility of its hook, spike, and axe head.
Long Range Weapons	Steel crossbow	30	Repeating crossbow	46	The repeating crossbow fired 20 shots in the span of 30 seconds, and was shown capable of penetrating the chain part of Vlad's plated chainmail although it was a glancing wound. In all, the crossbow delivered seven hits. However, the steel crossbow could only get off two shots and delivered only one kill, with the second bolt bouncing off Sun Tzu's leather armor. The edge was given to the repeating crossbow for its superior rate of fire.
Special Weapons	Hand cannon	71	Flaming arrows	31	The hand cannon delivered three kill shots and could be used as a spiked club if the shooter missed or ran out of ammunition. The flaming arrow could kill a group of enemies standing in a large oil-soaked area of dry brush through severe fire burns or smoke inhalation, but when it was tested directly against Vlad's plated chainmail armor, the first two shots bounced off the plates. A third shot only inflicted a shallow wound, with the flame actually cauterizing the wound. The edge was given to the hand cannon for its firepower and secondary function as a melee weapon. The hand cannon was described as the most accurate black-powder weapon yet seen on the show.
Totals		652		348	

Reenactment

Outside of Sun Tzu's campsite, Vlad the Impaler sets his shield into the ground and readies his hand cannon, firing a shot straight into Sun Tzu's teapot. Sun Tzu gets off a few shots with his repeating crossbow, hitting Vlad in the shoulder, before he retreats. Vlad pursues him but is thrown to the ground from the force of a flaming arrow, shot by Sun Tzu from the refuge of a tree. Sun jumps down from the tree, but is stabbed in the thigh by Vlad's halberd. In the confusion, he strikes the halberd with the edge of his hand and breaks the axe at the head, then manages to kick Vlad in the face.

Sun Tzu retreats again, using the distance to pull a spare set of his armor and a zhua from underneath fallen foliage. Vlad spots his armor and shoots him with his steel crossbow, but discovers that the armor is a decoy. Sun appears, disarming Vlad from his shield using the zhua. Vlad dodges another swing from the zhua and draws his kilij, slashing Sun across the midsection as he recovers. He pulls off his gauntlet, revealing that the zhua managed to cut his forearm, and charges Sun with his kilij. Sun pulls out his jian and they cross swords. Sun thrusts and Vlad severs both his hands at the wrist. He falls to his knees and Vlad raises his sword, preparing to decapitate him, but decides to impale him on a large stake instead.

Winner: Vlad the Impaler

== Episode 20: Ming Warriors vs. French Musketeers ==
	Ming Warriors	French Musketeers
Team	Jonathan Weizhang Wang (Kung fu world champion); Phillip Dang (combative Wushu champion)	Xavier Declie (French combat historian); Luke Lafontaine (sword master)
Weapons	Dao, 3-barrel pole gun, nest of bees, mechanical landmine	Rapier and main gauche, wheel lock pistol, flintlock musket, grenade
Armor	Leather lamellar	Steel cuirass
Statistics	Years active: 1368-1644; Warrior: 5'7", 150 pounds	Years active: 1622–1776; Warrior: 5'9", 160 pounds

Simulation results
	Ming Warriors	Kills	French Musketeers	Kills	Notes
Short Range Weapons	Dao	71	Rapier and main gauche	195	The rapier/main gauche combo delivered five kill strikes against a gel torso in 16 seconds. The rapier struck through a synthetic eyeball, cutting it in half; stabbed into the brain; stabbed the throat, severing the jugulars and the carotid artery; and stabbed between two ribs, piercing the heart. The main gauche stabbed into the abdomen and through the remaining synthetic eyeball into the brain. The rapier's thrusting speed was measured at 5.9 fps, or roughly 4 mph. The dao delivered five kill strikes against two pig carcasses in only seven seconds. It perforated a pig carcass, hitting the aorta and/or several vital organs if the same thrust was to be performed on a person. It also cut two pig carcasses in half with two strikes each. The dao's thrusting speed was measured at roughly 4.9 mph. The edge was given to the dao since it could be used both for thrusting and slashing.
Mid Range Weapons	3-barrel pole gun	41	Wheel lock pistol	178	The wheel lock pistol penetrated the Ming Warrior's studded leather armor and deliver three kill shots but misfired two times during its test. The 3-barrel pole gun was unable to penetrate the Musketeer's steel cuirass and could only inflict one kill and one wound. The edge was given to the wheel lock pistol due to the pole gun's failure.
Long Range Weapons	Nest of bees	15	Flintlock musket	275	Of the 32 rockets fired against a small battalion of dummy targets by the nest of bees, only six of them hit, with three of them being kill shots. The flintlock musket fired off three shots and inflicted one kill and two wounds on a gel torso. The edge was given to the musket for its accuracy, heavy caliber, and option to mount a plug bayonet.
Special Weapons	Mechanical landmine	199	Grenade	26	The mechanical landmine killed all four of its targets upon detonation, while the grenade only killed two of its targets and left the other two alive. The edge was given to the landmine for its larger explosive payload.
Totals		326		674	

Reenactment

Four Ming Warriors emerge from a cave on a cliff, waiting as a band of five Musketeers makes their way through a forest. A fifth is down below, setting up a mechanically triggered land mine and sticking a sword on top of it as bait. One of the Ming Soldiers launches a barrage of arrows at the Musketeers. The Musketeers run back to avoid the arrows but one is struck in the leg. Another Musketeer shoots lead Ming Warrior in the head, killing him. A Ming Warrior fires the 3-barrel pole gun and hits a Musketeer, but fails to kill him due to his armor. He is shot as he prepares his weapon again and rolls off down the hill. Another Warrior takes out a Musketeer with a second pole gun.

One Ming Warrior is killed by a Musketeer with a bayonet. The injured Musketeer grabs for the sword at the bottom of the cliff, activating the land mine; another is killed by a pole gun. One of the Musketeers shoots at a Ming Warrior with his musket but misses. The Warrior takes cover behind a rock while he reloads his weapon and the Musketeers take him out with a grenade. Another Ming Warrior ambushes them with a dao sword, killing one of them, but is himself killed after a brief scuffle. The remaining Musketeer is alerted to a surviving Warrior standing on the cliff above him with a dao. The two clash until the Musketeer is able to stab the Ming Warrior in the stomach with his main gauche, causing him to fall off the cliff.

Winner: French Musketeers

== Episode 21: Comanche vs. Mongol ==
	Comanche	Mongol
Team	Joaquin Gonzalez (Comanche horseman); Jay Redhawk (master horse archer)	Munkhtur Luvsanjambaa (native Mongol historian); Jason Nguyen (Asian combat expert)
Weapons	War hawk, war lance, bow and arrow, scalping knife	Flanged mace, glaive, bow and arrow, ild
Armor	Hair pipe breastplate, buffalo hide shield, bone armor	Leather lamellar, leather shield
Statistics	Years active: c. 1840; Warrior: 5'9", 145 pounds	Years active: c. 1225; Warrior: 5'5", 145 pounds

The Mongol is one of three warriors to get at least 100 kills with each weapon, and is the only warrior to lose while doing so. Before the simulation started, the Comanche expert demonstrated a scalping on a synthetic skull dressed in synthetic skin and hair.

Simulation results
	Comanche	Kills	Mongol	Kills	
Short Range Weapons	War hawk	152	Flanged mace	111	Tests were performed on a ballistics gel skull flanked by two synthetic bone skulls. The war hawk delivered death blows to all three skulls in 32 seconds, piercing into the braincase with a force of roughly 300 psi, while also stabbing upwards and tearing off the top half of the skull. However, the war hawk was stuck for several seconds in the second bone skull before it could move on to the ballistics skull. The iron flanged mace completely shattered all three skulls in 16 seconds, with a force of over 300 psi. The edge was given to the iron flanged mace for its tremendous killing power.
Mid Range Weapons	War lance	168	Glaive	116	The war lance was tested from horseback against two stand-ins on foot and a ballistics gel torso mounted on a horse. It struck at 40 mph at the point of impact, stabbing all three targets at the bottom of the heart, the tip reaching the spinal cord on the gel torso. The war lance actually penetrated deeper on the gel torso clad in a Mongol's hardened leather cuirass than against naked ballistics gel, striking 10-12 inches beneath the ribcage. The glaive was tested on a horse-shaped slab of beef mounted on a zip-line to simulate motion. It stabbed between the ribs at 32 mph and delivered a blow that would have struck the heart and/or the lungs on an actual horse. Although the glaive had a longer tip, the edge was given to the war lance since the glaive could not be used on horseback.
Long Range Weapons	Bow and arrow	205	Bow and arrow	142	Against seven targets, the Comanche bow delivered six hits and achieved four kills and one wound in 28 seconds. It was capable of firing three arrows at once. The Mongol bow delivered five hits and achieved four kills in 33 seconds. Both archers had one missed shot. The edge was given to the Comanche bow for its speed and accuracy.
Special Weapons	Scalping knife	3	Ild	103	The ild cut apart a pig carcass in 10 strikes, visually severing the ribcage and spinal cord. The ild's striking speed was clocked at 67 mph. The scalping knife disemboweled a pig carcass with several strikes, inflicting wounds on the torso which would have inflicted a collapsed lung on a human target. It also stabbed into the neck and struck the jugular vein and/or carotid artery, and disemboweled the pig. The scalping knife's stabbing speed was clocked at roughly 30 mph. The edge was given to the ild sword for its bigger size and cutting power.
Totals		528		472	

Reenactment

The Comanche shoots an arrow from atop a ridge, his back to the sun. It lands a foot away from the Mongol sharpening his ild in the valley, but the Mongol is unable to pinpoint where it came from. The Comanche fires twice more, missing both times, before falling back. The Mongol rides his horse to the top of the hill and is briefly confused when the Comanche is not there, giving the Comanche the opportunity to shoot him in the chest with his bow and arrow from behind his own horse. The arrow is stopped by the lamellar breastplate. The Comanche hides in a bush with his war lance and ambushes the Mongol as he rides past, throwing him from his horse. The Mongol swings his glaive but is parried by the Comanche's war lance. The Mongol counters by slashing at the Comanche's back. The Comanche rolls, dropping his lance. When the Mongol goes in for a thrust, the Comanche is able to grab the glaive, and counters with an elbow strike to the Mongol's head. He stomps on the glaive, breaking it, as the Mongol unsheathes his ild. The Comanche pulls out his war hawk and they clash.

The Mongol manages to slash the Comanche's forearm. When he goes in for another swing, the Comanche grabs his arms, knocks the ild from his hands, and stabs him in the back with the war hawk. The Mongol knocks the Comanche to the ground, then chases him into a cave. Inside the cave, the Mongol is briefly delayed when he can't find the Comanche. When he moves in to attack, his mace hits the cave wall, missing the Comanche. He swings again, hitting the floor. The Comanche swings the war hawk, but the Mongol hits him in the back, sending him reeling. The Mongol swings again, but the Comanche ducks under and stabs him in the side with his scalping knife. When the Mongol swings again, the Comanche stabs him two more times. While the Mongol is stunned, the Comanche buries his war hawk into the Mongol's neck, then cuts off his scalp with the scalping knife.

Winner: Comanche

== Episode 22: Navy SEALs vs. Israeli Commandos ==
	Navy SEALs	Israeli Commandos
Team	Rob Roy (22-year SEAL veteran); Colin Palmer (former SEAL explosives expert)	Moti Horenstein (Israeli Special Forces instructor); Mike Kanarek (Israeli Special Forces veteran)
Weapons	Recon 1 knife, SIG Sauer P226, M4 Colt Commando, C4	KA-BAR knife, Glock 19, Micro Galil, semtex
Armor	Combat helmet	KASDA helmet
Statistics	Years active: est. 1961; Force size: Approx 2000; Warrior: 6'0", 185 pounds	Years active: est. 1957; Force size: Classified; Warrior: 5'10", 180 pounds

This is the second match-up where the competitors are allies who train with each other in real life, the first being SWAT vs. GSG9. Both teams did not use one of their weapons in the final battle (knives and pistols, respectively). This episode also marks the first time in a simulated squad battle that one combatant was able to take out two enemies at once, and is the only instance of doing so to win. This is the closest match in Season 2.

An additional test compared the hand-to-hand techniques of the two: the Commando's Krav Maga and the SEALs' Close Quarters Defense (CQD). Despite this, the results were neither shown nor factored into the simulation.

Simulation results
	Navy SEALs	Kills	Israeli Commandos	Kills	Notes
Short Range Weapons	Recon 1 knife	15	KA-BAR knife	42	The KA-BAR ripped apart the gel torso with a stabbing speed of 29 fps, severing the windpipe, the spinal cord, and every major blood vessel in the neck. The Recon 1 decapitated, amputated, and disemboweled the gel torso with a stabbing speed of 32 fps. Both weapons were considered equally effective, resulting in a draw.
Mid Range Weapons	SIG Sauer P226	101	Glock 19	98	The Glock 19 was tested against the SIG Sauer P226 in breaking five lights and eliminating two targets inside a mock-up bistro. The SIG Sauer P226 finished in 13.84 seconds, while the Glock finished in 20.03 seconds. The edge was given to the SIG P226 for the better shooting of the SEALs.
Long Range Weapons	M4 Colt Commando	355	Micro Galil	288	The Micro Galil was tested against the M4 Colt Commando in hitting a moving pig target surrounded by four bystanders. The M4 hit the pig target with all 30 rounds in 34s while the Micro Galil fired only 23 rounds in 48s, achieving 21 hits and two grazes. The edge was given to the M4 for its accuracy, faster rate of fire, and tighter grouping.
Explosive Weapons	C4	47	Semtex	54	In the first round of testing, the C4 destroyed a boat along with the two targets that were on it, while a Semtex-laced cellphone killed its target without harming four bystanders. In the second round of testing, 1 lb of each explosive was detonated in two separate wooden outhouses, with the C4 generating ~270 psi and the Semtex generating ~324 psi. The edge was given to the Semtex for its greater explosive force.
Totals		518		482	

Reenactment 22

Outside of a power plant occupied by the Israeli Commandos, a Navy SEAL takes out a Commando patrolling the upper walkway using a M4 Colt Commando. The SEALs then infiltrate the facility through a tower into the basement, while Commandos fire at them from the balcony. Inside the basement, the SEALs break off into a two-man unit and a three-man unit, while a three-man unit of Commandos heads in their direction. Two Commandos set up an explosive trap with semtex stuck to it, which they attach to a doorknob with string. When the SEALs open the door, one is killed and the other is knocked to the ground, where he is finished off by a waiting Commando with his Micro Galil.

Up above, the three-man SEAL team takes out a Commando on the stairs with his M4 Colt Commando. The three remaining Commandos come through the doorway and burst-fire their Micro Galils at the SEALs, killing one of them. The two other SEALs enter another building while the Commandos regroup, then give chase. They meet in an open area among machines and a turbine. The SEAL leader exchanges fire with two Commandos, while a little ways away, the Commando leader's Micro Galil jams and he is forced to dispose of it. The other SEAL, who had been hiding behind the turbine, shoots a Commando in the head with his Colt. The lead SEAL runs down a flight of stairs, drawing the attention of the Commando, but is ambushed and killed with a KA-BAR knife.

The final Navy SEAL sets up a C4 charge in the basement and sticks it behind a set of pipes, then hides and waits for the Commandos. He manages to lure them towards the C4, killing them both when he sets it off.

Winner: Navy SEALs
