= Schü-mine 42 =

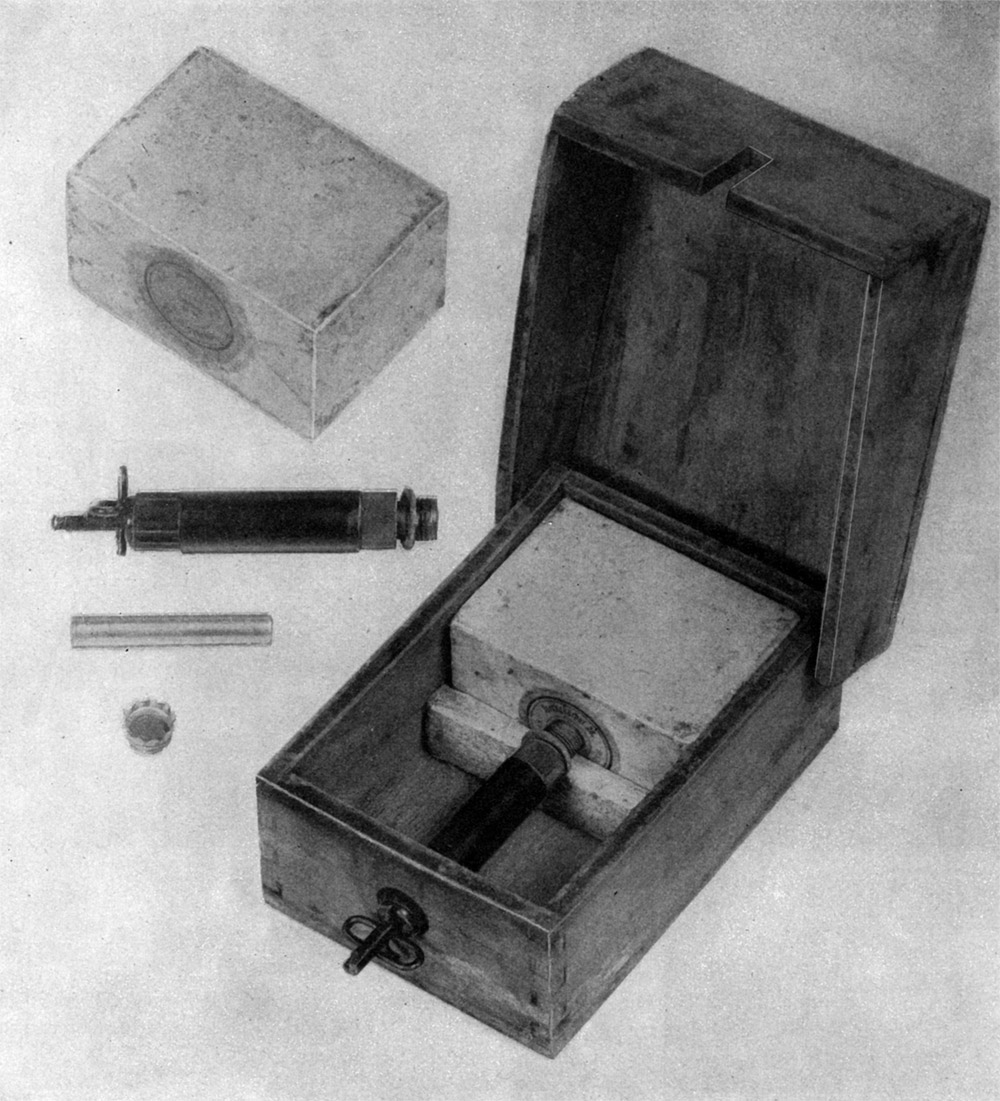
- A Schü-mine 42 with a ZZ 42 detonator; the components of the mine are shown to the left
- Type: Anti-personnel blast mine
- Place of origin: Nazi Germany

Service history
- Used by: Germany
- Wars: World War II

Specifications
- Mass: 1.1 pounds (0.50 kg)
- Length: 4.72 inches (120 mm)
- Width: 3.55 inches (90 mm)
- Height: 1.77 inches (45 mm)
- Filling: TNT
- Filling weight: 200 grams (7.1 oz)
- Detonation mechanism: ZZ-42 type detonator, pressure

The Schü-mine 42 (Schützenmine 42, "rifleman's mine model of 1942") was a German anti-personnel mine used during the Second World War. It consisted of a simple wooden box with a hinged lid containing a 200-gram (7.1 oz) block of cast TNT and a ZZ-42 type detonator. A slot in the lid pressed down on the striker retaining pin, sufficient pressure on the lid caused the pin to move, releasing the striker which triggered the detonator.

The mine was cheap to produce and deployed in large numbers. As an early example of a minimum metal mine, it was difficult to detect with early metal detectors – the only metal present was a small amount in the mine's detonator.

Experience has shown that the mine detector search coil must pass very close to the mine before any reaction is obtained. Detection is still more difficult when the search is made in ground containing shrapnel. Also it is hard to locate the Schü-mine by observation or probing because it is relatively small.

During Operation Overlord, the British resorted to using explosive detection dogs to find them.

In his book A CANLOAN Officer, Rex Fendick, serving with the 2nd Battalion of The Middlesex Regiment during the Normandy campaign, mentions finding what was believed to be a German radio transmitter backpack. It transpired that the device was actually a Geiger counter used to detect Schü-mines that had been daubed with a patch of radioactive paint.

== See also ==
Similar mines

- PP Mi-D, PMD-6, PMD-7, PMD-57, Type 59, PMD-1
