= Deadliest Warrior season 3 =

Third season of an American historical weapon reenactment show

Deadliest Warrior
- Season 3
- No. of episodes: 10

Release
- Original network: Spike
- Original release: July 20 – September 14, 2011

Season chronology
- ← Previous; Season 2

Shortly after the season 2 finale, season 3 was announced on Spike.com, soon followed by a live Aftermath featuring new host Richard "Mack" Machowicz answering fan questions. On October 13 the show announced the start of production for the season. Over the course of several weeks, Spike revealed the Season 3 match-ups. The battle simulator, created by host Max Gieger, was able to simulate 5,000 battles as opposed to the previous 1,000. The new format (except for Vampires vs. Zombies) was a squad-on-squad battle of 5 vs. 5, which had previously been reserved only for modern matches. An average of 100 different X-factors were factored into each simulation, each being rated on a scale from 1 to 100, though only a few were mentioned. Season 3 premiered on July 20, 2011, at 10 pm EDT.

== Episode 23: George Washington vs. Napoleon Bonaparte ==
	George Washington	Napoleon Bonaparte
Team	Paul Suda (18th-century weapons expert); Wayne Lee (Professor of Military History)	Mathew Cape (19th-century weapons expert); Phillipe Simon (Napoleonic historian)
Weapons	Colichemarde Sword, Brown Bess Flintlock Musket & Pennsylvania Long Rifle, 6-Pound Cannon	Cavalry Saber, 1777 Charleville Musket, 8-Pound Cannon
Tactics	Hybrid Warfare	"Bait and Bash"
Logistics X-Factor	73	79
Tactics X-Factor	84	88
Fatigue X-Factor	74	67
Generalship X-Factor	88	82
Warrior	6'3", 200 pounds c. 1781, aged 49	5'6", 140 pounds c. 1805, aged 37

Napoleon's Bait and Bash was given the edge due to the magnitude of the French victory at Austerlitz; Washington could not have won at Yorktown without his French allies. Napoleon's Bait and Bash tactic involved luring an enemy into position and attacking when the conditions were perfect, as seen during his greatest victory at the Battle of Austerlitz. There, he deceived the Russo-Austrian army into thinking that he was planning to surrender by withdrawing from the Pratzen Heights and then used the cover of fog to mount a surprise attack on the weakened center of their lines. Washington's Hybrid Warfare involved the use of hit-and-run guerrilla warfare to weaken the British Army while the Continental Army fought the conventional battles and sieges. This successfully led to his greatest victory at the Battle of Yorktown.

In the reenactment, George Washington is one of six warriors with no battle cry at the end, as an example of him being the "gentleman soldier."

Simulation results
	George Washington	Percentage	Napoleon	Percentage	Notes
Short Range Weapons	Colichemarde Sword	53%	Cavalry Saber	47%	The weapons were tested in eliminating three targets from horseback and on foot. Although both blades were evenly match with three kills and the cavalry saber had flexibility, the edge was given to the Colichemarde sword since it was optimized for dismounted and anti-saber combat.
Mid Range Weapons	Brown Bess Flintlock Musket & Pennsylvania Long Rifle	73%	1777 Charleville Musket	27%	Two four-man squads, one armed with four 1777 Charleville muskets and one armed with two Brown Bess muskets and two Pennsylvania Long Rifles, were tested against each other in eliminating four infantry and one mounted officer with five bullets each. The French squad eliminated only four infantry in 1 minute 43 seconds, while the American squad eliminated all five targets and the simulated horse in 3 minutes 31 seconds. Although it was very slow to reload, the edge was given to the Pennsylvania Long Rifle for its greater range and accuracy.
Long Range Weapons	6-Pound Cannon	31%	8-Pound Cannon	69%	The cannons were tested in eliminating six targets and one cannon at 200 yards. The 8-pounder achieved three kills and destroyed one cannon, while the 6-pounder achieved only two kills and destroyed one cannon. In the Anti-Personnel Munition test, the 8-pounder achieved an 8/15 kill ratio with its grapeshot while the 6-pounder achieved only a 4/15 kill ratio with its scattershot. The edge was given to the French 8-pounder for its firepower and the better quality of its munitions and crew.
Totals	2,530	50.6%	2,470	49.4%	

Reenactment 23

The Grande Armée climbs a hilltop, where Napoleon observes Washington's Continental Army relaxing near their cannon. Washington rides up and greets his troops before noticing Napoleon's troops watching them. Napoleon orders a charge as Washington's men take defensive positions and start firing, though none of them hit their targets. One of Napoleon's men kills a Continental soldier and a Continental soldier kills one of Napoleon's men. Washington's sharpshooter takes out Napoleon's mounted lieutenant. Napoleon's army fires their cannon first and takes out another one of Washington's men, but a man of their own is decapitated by Washington's cannon. Another shot from Napoleon's cannon disables Washington's artillery.

Washington's men charge while Napoleon hastily reloads. He kills one of the soldiers with a grapeshot from his cannon. Washington mounts a horse and he and Napoleon kill each other's final soldier, then charge. Washington is knocked off his horse and Napoleon dismounts to engage him. They clash swords briefly before Washington punches Napoleon in the face, stunning him. They engage again; Washington eventually gets the upper hand and thrusts his sword into Napoleon's neck. Instead of sounding a battle cry, Washington casually cleans his sword and gazes upon the horizon.

Winner: George Washington

== Episode 24: Joan of Arc vs. William the Conqueror ==
	Joan of Arc	William the Conqueror
Team	Claire Dodin (15th-century weapons expert); Timothy Pickles (military historian)	Jason McNeil (medieval combat specialist); Stephen Morillo (Chair of History, Wabash College)
Weapons	French Arming Sword, Steel Crossbow, Siege Cannon	Norman Broadsword, Composite Crossbow, Torsion Catapult
Armor	Plate armor	Chain mail Hauberk
Tactics	"Audacious Attack"	Feigned Retreat
Physicality X-Factor	64	78
Experience X-Factor	58	81
Tactics X-Factor	72	78
Intuition X-Factor	84	80
Logistics X-Factor	74	72
Killer Instinct X-Factor	83	86
Warrior	5'4", 125 pounds c. 1429, aged 17	5'10", 215 pounds c. 1066, aged 38

This was the first co-ed episode, with Joan of Arc being only the second female warrior, as well as the first female to lead a team and to survive the final battle. She is the only warrior whose historical death is shown. This was also the first ancient match to feature 5-on-5, to have a counter to tell how many combatants are remaining on each side, and to test siege engines. A bonus scene available online went into more detail about two X-factors that went into the simulator, including "Logistics", in which Joan received a rating of 74 compared to William's rating of 72, and "Killer Instinct", in which William was rated 86 while Joan was rated 83.

For military tactics, Joan's "Audacity" was compared to William's "Feigned Retreat". During the Siege of Orleans (1428–1429), Joan snuck some of her forces into Orléans and then ordered them to regroup for a bold, frontal attack on the English Siege Post, which succeeded in lifting the siege and saving Orléans from capitulation. At the Battle of Hastings in 1066, William's initial uphill attack was foiled by the Anglo-Saxon shield wall formation on top of a hill. By feigning retreats, he deceived them into breaking their shield wall formation and coming off the high ground, allowing his forces to inflict significant casualties on the pursuing English forces. With the Anglo-Saxon ranks thinned out and their shield wall reduced in effectiveness, William ordered his archers to fire on the rear of the army which succeeded in inflicting further casualties and mortally wounding King Harold Godwinson, clinching the victory for the Normans. The panel gave the edge to William's "Feigned Retreat" over Joan's "Audacity" for the greater tactical significance of his victory at Hastings.

Simulation results
	Joan of Arc	Percentage	William the Conqueror	Percentage	Notes
Short Range Weapons	French Arming Sword	49%	Norman Broadsword	51%	The swords were tested in eliminating four targets and damaging one special target wearing the opposing warrior's armor. The Arming sword, which allowed for half-swording techniques, achieved four kills and easily penetrated William's chainmail armor in 35 seconds. The Norman broadsword achieved five kills in 21 seconds but could not penetrate Joan's plate armor. The edge was given to the Norman Broadsword for its better performance at thrusting and slashing.
Mid Range Weapons	Steel Crossbow	55%	Composite Crossbow	45%	The crossbows were tested in eliminating three defenders. The Composite Crossbow scored a 3/9 hit ratio, a 1/6 kill ratio, and an Average Reload time of 20 seconds, while the Steel Crossbow scored a 6/9 hit ratio, a 4/6 kill ratio, and an Average Reload time of 57 seconds. Even though it was very slow to reload, the edge was given to the Steel Crossbow for its better accuracy and longer range.
Long Range Weapons	Siege Cannon	51%	Torsion Catapult	49%	The weapons were tested in a simulated castle siege. The Siege Cannon inflicted heavy damage on a wall with its first three shots and bored a large hole into a gel dummy with the fifth shot. The average reload time was 1 minute and 24 seconds. The Torsion Catapult fired rocks over a castle wall and scored a 3/5 kill ratio with an average reload time of 1 minute and 1 second. The edge was given to the Siege Cannon for its intimidation factor and ability to actually breach a castle wall.
Armor Effectiveness	Plate Armor	56%	Chain mail Hauberk	44%	The armor was tested for encumbrance and protection capability. Joan's Full Plate only reduced her mobility by 14% and deflected a blow from the Norman broadsword. In contrast, William's chainmail hauberk reduced his mobility by 27% and was easily pierced three times by the Arming sword. The edge was given to Joan's Full Plate for its durability and maneuverability.
Totals	2,587	51.74%	2,413	48.26%	

Reenactment 24

Joan of Arc finishes a prayer and resumes her siege on William's castle, assisted by four French knights while William the Conqueror defends with four Norman soldiers. Two of the Norman soldiers (one on the ramparts and one in an arrow slit) fire their composite crossbows, but both miss. The French fire their siege cannon, damaging the wall and killing an archer. William orders his men to load and fire the torsion catapult, crushing one of the French with a rock. Another shot from the siege cannon breaches the castle wall and destroys the catapult. One of the French kills a crossbowman, and a Norman soldier shoots Joan with his crossbow, but the bolt is unable to penetrate her plate armor. He then shoots one of Joan's knights and is subsequently killed by Joan herself. Joan picks up his crossbow and kills another Norman.

Joan and her two remaining knights enter the castle through the breach in the wall. William's fourth and final soldier kills one of the knights and is stabbed through the neck with an arming sword, leaving William alone with just his sword and shield. Joan and her knight approach from two separate sets of stairs; the knight reaches William first and is killed after a short grapple. William and Joan fight, with William using his physicality, size, and leverage to strike Joan in the chest. Her armor absorbs the blow from his blade and is dented, but holds. William tries to swing his broadsword down from overhead, but Joan, from a few steps down the stairs, stabs him twice in the left leg. As he collapses, he makes one last effort to kill her, but Joan stabs him one more time, causing him to fall from the steps.

Winner: Joan of Arc

== Episode 25: U.S. Army Rangers vs. North Korean Special Ops ==
	U.S. Army Rangers	North Korean Special Ops
Team	Ssgt. Tim Kennedy (U.S. Army Ranger); Lt. Col. John Lock (U.S. Army Ranger and historian)	Charles Joh (SWAT CDR and Tactics Specialist); Ji Jay Kim (former South Korean Marine); Thomas Rix (former U.S. Intelligence Officer); Grand Master Ho Jin Song (9th Degree Black Belt)
Weapons	M4 Assault Rifle, SR-25 Sniper Rifle, Claymore Mine	Type 68 AKM, PSL, Anti-Personnel Box Mine
Hand-to-Hand Combat	Special Operations Combatives Program	Hapkido and Tae-Kwon-Do Hybrid
Discipline X-Factor	83	88
Terrain Familiarity X-Factor	78	88
Extremism X-Factor	83	90
Psych Warfare X-Factor	74	86
Operational Experience X-Factor	85	78
Hand-To-Hand Combat X-Factor	89	81
Warrior	5'9", 175 pounds Aged 24	5'6", 135 pounds Aged 27

This episode used footage from Black Hawk Down, which is based on a real-life story. This is the first match-up which could potentially take place in real life due to the relations between the two warriors' countries. This is the only match-up without short range weapons, the third without any melee weapons, and the third to feature hand-to-hand combat. The PSL is one of two weapons to not score any kills in the Season 3-formatted simulation. This battle is the closest match in Deadliest Warrior history with a difference of just 8 kills. A bonus scene available online showed the battlefield tactics of each warrior in the scenario of the U.S.'s response to North Korea invading South Korea, which Mack deemed too close to call for him to give either side the edge.

For close combat, the NKSOF's hapkido/tae-Kwon-Do combination was compared to the Army Ranger's SOCP. The combination of hapkido and taekwondo relies on using the attacker's energy against him and attacking his pressure points as well as using circular motions and quick strikes followed by a lethal finishing blow while SOCP relies on simple, quick blunt force to do damage and make space. Both styles of fighting were deemed to be equally effective but were factored into the simulation as X-factors, not weapons.

Simulation results
	U.S. Army Rangers	Percentage	North Korean Special Ops	Percentage	Notes
Mid Range Weapons	M4 Assault Rifle	45%	Type 68 AKM	55%	The rifles were tested in eliminating six targets inside a command post. Although both rifles completed the test in 30 seconds, the Type 68 used only 13 shots while the M4 used all 30 shots. The edge was given to the Type 68 for its greater stopping power.
Long Range Weapons	SR-25 Sniper Rifle	55%	PSL	45%	The rifles were tested in eliminating six targets (three static, one moving, one hidden, and one counter-sniper) during a simulated assault on a communications post. The SR-25 completed the test in 1 minute and 48 seconds while the PSL completed the test in 2 minutes and 7 seconds. The edge was given to the SR-25 for its lighter recoil and 20-round magazine capacity.
Special Weapons	Claymore Mine	72%	Anti-Personnel Box Mine	28%	The mines were tested in eliminating a group of three targets. The box mine failed to trigger the pointman's 100G shock patch but still killed it with a potentially fatal leg amputation while the M18 Claymore killed all three targets through its shrapnel spray. The edge was given to the M18 Claymore for its higher lethality.
Totals	2,504	50.08%	2,496	49.92%	

Reenactment 25

A group of five U.S. Army Rangers prepare to raid a North Korean-occupied facility somewhere in the Korean Peninsula. As they march towards the facility, the sniper breaks off to set up his SR-25, spotting the enemy sniper and spotter, as well as a patrolling soldier below, as he does so. He takes out the sniper and the patrolman before vacating the area. Elsewhere, one Ranger triggers a box landmine in a drainage ditch, sending him flying and alerting nearby two Korean Special Ops. One of the Rangers attempts to save the downed man from Korean fire but both are killed. The three Koreans eventually fall back into the facility and the Americans pursue them, taking down one of the Koreans inside.

The Ranger sniper rigs a Claymore mine but is confronted by one of the Korean Special Ops. The sniper is severely injured by the Korean, but manages to detonate the mine, killing them both. Elsewhere in the facility, the Korean leader kills a Ranger from his hiding place in the shadows. He and the Ranger leader exchange gunfire, with the American continuing to pursue him as he attempts to escape. From behind a wall, the Korean tries to wrest the Ranger's M4 away from him but is hit across the face with the rifle. The Korean leader brings the American to his knees with a spinning hook kick and tries to strangle him from behind, but the Ranger flips him over his shoulder. They continue to grapple before the American leader gets the upper hand and fires a rifle round that kills the Korean leader. The Ranger raises his fist and shouts "Rangers lead the way!" in victory.

Winner: U.S. Army Rangers

== Episode 26: Genghis Khan vs. Hannibal ==
	Genghis Khan	Hannibal
Team	Khosbayar (U.S. Marine and Mongol Weapons Expert); Timothy May (author, The Mongol Art of War)	Bryan Forrest (classical weapons specialist); Patrick Hunt (Professor of Archaeology, Stanford University)
Weapons	Turko-Mongol Saber, Jida Lance, Mongol Recurve Bow	Falcata, Soliferrum, War elephant
Armor	Lamellar Armor	Musculata Armor
Tactics	Feigned Retreat	Double Envelopment
Intimidation X-Factor	89	86
Battlefield Strategy X-Factor	89	76
Physicality X-Factor	76	81
Armor Metallurgy X-Factor	85	74
Warrior	5'8", 170 pounds c. 1206, aged 39	5'7", 155 pounds c. 216 B. C., aged 26

This is the first and only time in which an animal was tested as a weapon, and is the only reality-based episode in season 3 that did not feature any black-powder weapons. A bonus clip only available online shows the elephant taking down several targets while charging at a speed of 24 mph (39 km/h) as well as Khosbayar attempting to stop a simulated elephant from charging with fire arrows.

Hannibal's "Double Envelopment" was compared to Genghis Khan's "Feigned Retreat". At the Battle of Cannae, Hannibal tempted the Roman army into specifically attacking the center of his army by deploying in a formation that had strong flanks and a thin, weak center that was curved outward. The Roman infantry force of 70,000 took the bait by focusing all of their efforts onto the center until they were trapped in a double-envelopment and slaughtered down to only a handful of survivors. At the Battle of Kalka River, the Mongols, using only a small force of 2,000 Mongolian cavalry, agitated a sizable force of 30,000 Rus and Kipchaks into attacking them and kept them focused on trying to pursue them by constantly launching hit-and-run attacks and denying them the opportunity for a battle. The pursuit lasted for nind days and stretched for 200 miles which left the Rus and Kipchaks disorganized, tired, and blindly determined, which led to them being trapped and defeated by a waiting army of 18,000 Mongolians in an ambush on the banks of the Kalka River. The edge was given to Genghis Khan for his tactical ability in luring away and weakening the enemy. However, in reality, Khan was not present at the Battle of the Kalka River.

Simulation results
	Genghis Khan	Percentage	Hannibal	Percentage	Notes
Short Range Weapons	Turko-Mongol Saber	57%	Falcata	43%	The swords were tested in eliminating four targets on foot and one target on horseback. In the first test, both swords achieved four kills, but in the second test on horseback, the Saber succeeded while the Falcata failed. The Saber had a swing force of 72 mph but was deemed to be slower and draining on the user's stamina while the Falcata was faster but had a swing force of only 66 mph. The edge was given to Genghis Khan's Turko-Mongol Saber for its cutting power and longer blade.
Mid Range Weapons	Jida Lance	14%	Soliferrum	86%	The weapons were tested in eliminating a moving target from horseback. Although the Jida was longer and more likely to achieve a kill, the edge was given to the Soliferrum since it could be used as a missile-weapon and several would be carried in Hannibal's convoy.
Special Weapons	Mongol Recurve Bow	38%	War Elephant	62%	The stomping power of an elephant was measured at 2,045 lb (928 kg) which, if inflicted on a human, meets or exceeds every threshold of lethal injury. The Recurve Bow could achieve painful, but non-lethal, penetrations into elephant hide with armor-piercing arrows. Mack did point out that these arrows would cause pain to the elephant and likely cause it to panic and lose control. The edge was given to the war elephant for its massive intimidation and killing power. Suzie, not being a trained War Elephant, was egged on by her trainer, Hayden Rosenaur, throughout the testing.
Totals	2,739	54.78%	2,261	45.22%	

Armor Failure Rates
	Genghis Khan	Percentage	Hannibal	Percentage	Notes
Body	Steel Lamellar	1.32%	Brass Musculata	4.22%	The body armor was tested in protecting against the opposing warrior's sword. Both the Musculata and the Lamellar sustained harmless penetration, not enough to even touch the wearer.
Head	Steel Helmet	.78%	Brass Helmet	7.48%	Hannibal's brass helmet dented and failed at 435 psi (3,000 kPa), which meant a depressed skull fracture, while Genghis Khan's helmet was not only unscathed, but there was not enough force to damage the skull.
Shield	Steel	7.48%	Bronze-Rimmed Wooden	2.80%	Both Hannibal and Genghis Khan's shields held well, with the arm behind it not encountering enough force to break bone.

The edge was given to Genghis Khan due to the failure of Hannibal's helmet and since Genghis Khan's armor was made of a stronger material.

Reenactment 26

Genghis Khan, mounted on horseback, and four of his Mongol soldiers encounter Hannibal, mounted on a war elephant, and four of his Carthaginian soldiers; three on foot and one on a horse. Genghis Khan orders his men to load their bows. One arrow lodges in Hannibal's shield and another kills one of the Carthaginians. The other Carthaginians are ordered to attack with Soliferrums, and a Mongol wielding a Jida Lance is killed. Khan follows this by killing one of the Carthaginians with a Jida Lance. On the other side of the hill, Hannibal dismounts the elephant before commanding it to charge at the Mongolians. The three Mongolians attempt to shoot it with arrows but are forced to retreat; one Mongol is trampled. From the sidelines, they continue firing arrows until the elephant is driven away from the battlefield. Elsewhere, Khan rides in on his war horse and strikes down a Carthaginian soldier with his Turko-Mongol Saber.

Meanwhile, one of the Carthaginians charges at the two remaining Mongolians, catching one's attention by throwing a Soliferrum at his head; the iron javelin is deflected. The Carthaginian deflects a blow from a saber and stabs one of the Mongols through his leather lamellar with his Falcata. After a brief scuffle, the remaining Mongol kills the Carthaginian and is quickly impaled by Hannibal. Khan approaches, discarding his bow, and dismounts. The men clash swords. Hannibal is slashed across the thighs with Khan's Falcata and eventually has the shield knocked from his hands. He stabs at Khan with his own Falcata but it fails to pass through the steel lamellar armor. Khan counters with two consecutive head shots to Hannibal's brass helmet, severely denting it and dizzying him, before delivering the fatal strike by slashing Hannibal across the neck.

Winner: Genghis Khan

== Episode 27: Saddam Hussein vs. Pol Pot ==
	Saddam Hussein	Pol Pot
Team	Sabah Khodada (former Iraqi Army General); Calvin Bondley (Saddam weapons specialist); Lt. Col. Rick Francona (former USAF and CIA agent)	Jonathan Khan (Pol Pot weapons expert); Kilong Ung (Cambodian genocide survivor
Weapons	Combat Knife, Browning Semi-Automatic Pistol, RPK Light Machine Gun, RGD-5 Grenade	Cane knife, Tokarev TT-33, RPD Light Machine Gun, Chinese Stick Grenade
Dominance X-Factor	78	75
Training X-Factor	70	53
Psychological Health X-Factor	46	27
Initiative X-Factor	74	83
Killer Instinct X-Factor	86	89
Warrior	6'2", 215 pounds Aged 50; reign of terror: 1979-2003	5'9", 194 pounds Aged 50; reign of terror: 1975-1979

This was the first episode where an expert, in this case Sabah Khodada, was unable to speak English and required a translator. He was also the only expert to have personally known one of the named warriors, having served under Saddam Hussein until he was imprisoned for insubordination. The show erroneously stated he was a general, but he was actually a captain in the Republican Guard. A bonus clip available online showcases each dictator's preferred method of torture: Pol Pot's electric shock and Saddam Hussein's chemical bath.

Simulation results
	Saddam Hussein	Percentage	Pol Pot	Percentage	Notes
Short Range Weapons	Combat Knife	54%	Cane knife	46%	The knives were tested in eliminating two targets. The combat knife killed both targets with a stabbing speed of 40 mph while the cane knife had a slashing speed of 45 mph but failed to kill the second target. The edge was given to the combat knife for its flexibility and portability.
Mid Range Weapons	Browning Semi-Automatic Pistol	62%	Tokarev TT-33	38%	The pistols were tested in eliminating two targets at phase 3 of the first test. Although the TT-33 finished the test at 2:02, the edge was given to the Browning Hi-Power for its 13-round capacity and heavier caliber.
Long Range Weapons	RPK Light Machine Gun	53%	RPD Light Machine Gun	47%	The machine guns were tested in eliminating a missed target in phase 1 of the first test, five targets in phase 2 of the same test, and eliminating two targets in a motorcade ambush with 80 rounds. During the first test, the RPK completed Phase 1 at 0:09 and Phase 2 at 1:20, but had to be reloaded, while the RPD completed Phase 1 at 0:12 and Phase 2 at 1:49. During the Motorcade Ambush test, the RPK completed with 59s while the RPD completed with 46s. The edge was given to the RPD for its 100-round Drum Magazine. The RPD Light Machine Gun is one of two weapons to not score any kills in the Season 3-formatted simulation.
Special Weapons	RGD-5 Grenade	41%	Chinese Stick Grenade	59%	The grenades were tested in eliminating four targets at phase 1 of the first test. Although both Grenades only killed three targets, the edge was given to the Chinese Stick Grenade for its higher explosive payload and lower risk of rolling off-target.
Totals	2,828	56.56%	2,172	43.44%	

Reenactment 27

Saddam Hussein sits in an office somewhere in Iraq, three of his Republic Guard standing outside and another inside watching over him. Outside, four armed Khmer Rouge guerrillas approach the building and seek cover. One throws a stick grenade at the guardhouse, killing two of Hussein's men. The remaining Iraqi soldier kills one Cambodian insurgent and stuns another with a RGD-5 grenade. Having been alerted by the initial blast, Hussein and his bodyguard emerge from the second-story balcony and begin shooting below, killing the remaining guerrilla fighter. As the bodyguard reloads, Pol Pot enters the scene and takes a dead Cambodian rebel's RPD machine gun, which he fires at the balcony. All three Iraqis retreat inside the building to regroup. As Pol Pot and his remaining soldiers cross the street to raid the building, Hussein's motorcade veers around the corner. The Cambodians head them off and Pol Pot kills the driver with his Tokarev TT-33, causing the car to veer off the road and crash into a house. Hussein and his bodyguard manage to escape the car before one of the Khmer Rogue rebels shoots the gas tank and the motorcade explodes. The final Guardsman shoots at him before Hussein intervenes and kills the rebel with his pistol.

Pol Pot and the Khmer Rouge approach the building and subdue Hussein's bodyguard in the alley with a cane knife. When they enter the building, Pol Pot's remaining rebel is killed by Hussein's combat knife. Hussein drags the dead rebel inside. Pol Pot readies himself with a cane knife and approaches Hussein, who he spots standing behind a wall with only his left arm visible. When he stabs into the neck, however, he realizes that the man behind the wall is his dead comrade wearing Hussein's jacket. Hussein emerges in an undershirt and shoots Pol Pot in the head with his pistol. He shouts "Allāhu Akbar!" (God is great) in victory.

Winner: Saddam Hussein

== Episode 28: Theodore Roosevelt vs. Lawrence of Arabia ==
	Theodore Roosevelt	Lawrence of Arabia
Team	Gsgt. Quay Terry (retired United States Marine Corps); Gary Harper (military historian/armorer)	Richard Reid (British firearms specialist); Gavin Scott (T. E. Lawrence historian)
Weapons	Bowie Hunter, 1896 Krag Carbine, Gatling Gun	Jambiya Dagger, Short Magazine Lee Enfield Rifle, Vickers machine gun
Tactics	"Suppress & Slaughter"	"Phantom Army"
Endurance X-Factor	71	88
Tactics X-Factor	75	81
Battlefield Experience X-Factor	67	76
Calm Under Fire X-Factor	86	81
Warrior	5'8", 210 pounds c. 1898, aged 39	5'5", 130 pounds c. 1916, aged 29

Lawrence of Arabia is the first warrior whose team members are not of the same nationality—Lawrence was a Lieutenant Colonel in the British Army who fought with Hashemite Arabs. This is the third episode in which the two opponents would have been allies in a real life combat situation. Theodore Roosevelt was very staunch and very vocal in his support of the Anglo-French Allies in World War I, even going so far as to offer to raise and lead up to four divisions of Rough Rider-style volunteers to fight against the Germans in France after the U.S. entered the war in 1917 – an offer which President Wilson turned down flat. Also, while President some years earlier, Roosevelt made it clear that the U.S. would cover the British Empire's back in any quarrel with Germany.

For military tactics, Roosevelt's Charge, aka "Suppress and Slaughter" was compared to Lawrence's Hit Hard and Vanish, aka "Phantom Army". At the Battle of San Juan Hill, the Rough Riders came under artillery and infantry fire and Roosevelt responded by ordering his Gatling gun detachment to provide suppressing fire which allowed his troops to charge up and take the San Juan and Kettle hill positions. At the Battle of Aqaba, Lawrence used several raids on the train routes north of the position to trick the Turkish army into thinking he was going to attack Damascus. The Turks took the bait by launching a pursuit against the Bedouin raiders which left only a battalion to defend Aqaba and allowed Lawrence to take the strategic port city after a successful attack. The edge was given to Lawrence for his tactical ability in deceiving and outmaneuvering the enemy. A bonus scene detailing the Battlefield Experience X-Factor was made available online.

Simulation results
	Theodore Roosevelt	Percentage	Lawrence of Arabia	Percentage	Notes
Short Range Weapons	Bowie Hunter	33%	Jambiya Dagger	67%	The knives were tested in eliminating two targets. The Bowie only killed one target and had an impact force of 42 mph while the jambiya killed both targets and had an impact force of 51 mph. The edge was given to the jambiya for its larger blade.
Mid Range Weapons	1896 Krag Carbine	46%	Short Magazine Lee Enfield Rifle	54%	The rifles were tested in velocity, damage, recoil performance, and in eliminating eight targets (three static, three moving, and two pop-up) with 20 rounds during a simulated assault. In the performance test, the Springfield Krag had a muzzle velocity of 1,958 ft/s (597 m/s), created a damage cavity of 5 in (130 mm), and imparted a recoil force of 9 lb while the SMLE had a muzzle velocity of 2,592 ft/s (790 m/s), created a damage cavity of 5.5 in (140 mm), and imparted a recoil force of 37 lb. During the assault test, the Springfield Krag scored an 8/8 kill ratio and a 16/20 hit ratio of 80% in 2:26 while the SMLE scored a 7/8 kill ratio and a 14/20 hit ratio of 70% in 2:15. Although the Springfield Krag was lighter and more accurate and the SMLE was stronger, faster to reload, and could hold twice as many rounds; ultimately, the weapons were considered to be equally matched in their overall effectiveness.
Long Range Weapons	Gatling Gun	58%	Vickers Machine Gun	42%	The guns were tested in eliminating 18 targets with 250 rounds. The Gatling gun scored a 13/18 kill ratio in 1:11 while the Vickers scored a 14/18 kill ratio in 1:41 but jammed once. The edge was given to the Gatling gun for its faster rate of fire and resistance to jamming.
Totals	2,582	51.64%	2,418	48.36%	

Reenactment 28

From a hillside, Roosevelt and four Rough Riders look up to see T. E. Lawrence approaching. Lawrence summons his Bedouin tribesmen, who appear with weapons and machine gun parts. The Rough Riders prepare the Gatling gun while the Bedouin prepare the Vickers machine gun and fire their SMLE rifles. Roosevelt fires back with his Krag rifle. One of the Rough Riders is killed by the Vickers gunman, who in turn is killed when his gun suddenly jams. Roosevelt calls for ceasefire when Lawrence and the Bedouin retreat. Roosevelt and the Riders inspect the abandoned machine gun site, failing to notice Lawrence and his men re-approaching from behind. Lawrence sets off a bundle of dynamite. As the Gatling crew turn the gun, a Bedouin rebel kills a Rough Rider; in reply, a Rough Rider kills a charging Bedouin. Another rebel shoots Roosevelt in the arm with his SMLE, forcing him to his knees. The rebel is quickly killed by a Rough Rider, who is subsequently killed by Lawrence. Roosevelt takes out the remaining Bedouin before he and the surviving Rough Rider pursue Lawrence into a trench, where Lawrence kills the Rider with his jambiya. Roosevelt, armed with his Bowie knife, scuffles with Lawrence, using his free hand to punch Lawrence in the face. While Lawrence is stunned, Roosevelt stabs him in the gut.

Winner: Theodore Roosevelt

== Episode 29: Ivan the Terrible vs. Hernán Cortés ==
	Ivan the Terrible	Hernán Cortés
Team	Vladimir Orlov (Russian Special Forces trainer); Andrew Jenks (Professor of Russian Studies)	Jason Heck (16th-century weapons expert); Kyle Lopez (Spanish colonial expert)
Weapons	Sablia, Bardiche, Pischal	Espada Ropera, Alabarda, Arquebus
Armor	Plated mail, fluted helmet	Steel breastplate, Tassets, Morion helmet
Intimidation X-Factor	90	82
Physicality X-Factor	84	69
Generalship X-Factor	54	76
Psychological Health X-Factor	37	72
Domination X-Factor	78	85
Warrior	6'0", 180 pounds c. 1560, aged 30	5'4", 135 pounds c. 1521, aged 36

This is the first episode to feature matchlock rifles, disproving the myth of their inaccuracy. For armor, Cortés' steel cuirass was compared to Ivan's plated mail in protection capability. Although both suits could be pierced by the opponent's long-range weapon, the edge was given to the cuirass for better resistance against thrusting and slashing blows. A bonus clip online showcases each conqueror's preferred method of torture: Ivan's quartering and Cortés' garrotting.

Simulation results
	Ivan the Terrible	Percentage	Hernán Cortés	Percentage	Notes
Short Range Weapons	Sablia	54%	Espada Ropera	46%	The swords were tested in slashing, thrusting, and horseback performance. The sablia passed both tests while the espada ropera cut a pig in half but failed on horseback. The edge was given for the sablia for its performance on horseback.
Mid Range Weapons	Bardiche	38%	Alabarda	62%	The polearms were tested in eliminating a gel torso and an opponent on horseback. The bardiche completely destroyed the gel torso but failed to take out the rider while the alabarda eliminated both the gel torso and the rider. The edge was given the alabarda for its lighter weight, flexibility, and reach.
Long Range Weapons	Pischal	59%	Arquebus	41%	The firearms were tested in eliminating three targets and piercing the opposing warrior's armor. Although both weapons killed all three targets with only two shots and pierced the opposing warrior's armor, the edge was given to the pischal for its faster reload, better accuracy and its stabilizing mount . The arquebus had used a stave to stabilize the gun's barrel as the pischal used the bardiche; one of Mack's notes on this was that you needed a weapon already prepared for use once the opponent was within a range, making the gun useless.
Totals	2,253	45.06%	2,747	54.94%	

Reenactment 29

Hernán Cortés and four of his conquistadors encounter Ivan the Terrible, two oprichniki horsemen, and two streltsy in the process of quartering a Spanish prisoner in a field. Cortés' men open fire on the Russian group with their arquebuses. Ivan uses one of his soldiers as a human shield before taking a horse from one of the oprichnik. The remaining streltsy sets up his bardiche and kills a conquistador. Ivan draws his sablia and successfully dismembers the prisoner as he rides away. The remaining streltsy and dismounted oprichnik charge at the Spaniards, who watch calmly as they finish reloading their weapons. Ivan reappears and kills two of them. Cortés, who is still armed with his alabarda, kills both oprichniki and remounts his own horse. The last Russian soldier shoots the last conquistador off his horse before being killed by Cortés. Ivan and Cortés, both on horseback, engage in battle. Cortés cuts Ivan's cheek while Ivan's saber fails to penetrate Cortés' steel breastplate. As the men charge at each other, Cortés ducks under Ivan's thrust and stabs him through the neck, killing him. Cortés loots his body for gold before shouting triumphantly.

Winner: Hernán Cortés

== Episode 30: Crazy Horse vs. Pancho Villa ==
	Crazy Horse	Pancho Villa
Team	Moses Brings Plenty (Lakota tribesman and firearms expert); Delano "Blu" Eagle (Lakota tribesman and former U.S. Marine)	Fernando Vazquez (expert marksman and horseman); Santiago Villalobos (Villa folklore historian)
Weapons	Inyankapemni Club, 1873 Colt, 1860 Henry Repeating Rifle	Bolo knife, Colt Bisley, 1894 Winchester Repeating Rifle
Tactics	Hit and Run	El Golpe Terrifico (The Terrific Blow)
Logistics X-Factor	54	84
Disease X-Factor	73	44
Tactics X-Factor	85	81
Audacity Health X-Factor	84	91
Warrior	5'8", 140 pounds c. 1876, aged 36	5'10", 170 pounds c. 1914, aged 36

For military tactics, Pancho Villa's "Ferocious Blow" was compared to Crazy Horse's "Hit and Run". At the Second Battle of Torreón, Pancho began his attack with an infantry advance which was a failure that resulted in them being counter-attacked and bombarded by a numerically superior force of 10,000 federale soldiers. Pancho's villistas soon redoubled their efforts by moving in at night and besieging the position that the artillery fire came from. At the Battle of Rosebud Creek, General Crook attempted to array his cavalry in a single line on the high ground, which Crazy Horse anticipated and responded to with hit-and-run raids. Due to a communications breakdown and inability to hit the attacking Sioux/Cheyenne raiders, Crazy Horse launched a frontal attack while Crook's forces were reloading and managed to outflank and overrun them, forcing Crook to withdraw and resulting in the annihilation of Custer's 7th Cavalry at the Little Bighorn. The edge was given to Crazy Horse for his tactical abilities in using the terrain to his advantage, outmaneuvering the enemy, and using their numbers and inability to coordinate and resupply against them.

Simulation results
	Crazy Horse	Percentage	Pancho Villa	Percentage	Notes
Short Range Weapons	Inyankapemni Club	42%	Bolo knife	58%	The weapons were tested in damaging a gel torso in 15 seconds. The Inyankapemni caused a depressed skull fracture and had a swing force of 104 mph but broke during the test while the bolo knife achieved a decapitation. The edge was given to the bolo knife for its durability and flexibility.
Mid Range Weapons	1873 Colt	54%	Colt Bisley	46%	The Colt Bisley was tested against the 1873 Colt in ballistics performance and eliminating five targets with six rounds without hitting a horse. The Colt Bisley had a muzzle velocity of 1168 fps while the Colt 1873 had a muzzle velocity of 997 fps but caused more internal damage. In the second test, both guns had a 5/6 hit ratio with the 1873 Colt scoring a 3/5 kill ratio in 21 seconds to the Colt Bisley's 2/5 kill ratio in 17 seconds. The edge was given to the 1873 Colt for its longer barrel and higher damage.
Long Range Weapons	1860 Henry Repeating Rifle	46%	1894 Winchester Repeating Rifle	54%	The 1860 Henry was tested against the 1894 Winchester in eliminating four targets at 50 yards and five targets on horseback. In the first test, the 1860 Henry scored a 40% hit ratio and two kills in 1:15 but jammed once while the 1894 Winchester scored a 40% hit ratio and one kill in 48 seconds. In the second test, both weapons scored a 3/5 hit ratio with two kills to the 1860 Henry and one kill to the 1894 Winchester. The edge was given to the 1894 Winchester since it was a newer and more reliable rifle.
Totals	2,316	46.32%	2,684	53.68%	

Reenactment 30

Crazy Horse and four Lakota approach Pancho Villa's campsite, where Villa and four Villistas are resting. The Villistas take up defensive positions with their Winchesters while the Lakota charge, firing their Henry rifles. One of the Lakota is killed by one of the Mexican's Colt Bisley; meanwhile, Crazy Horse shoots a Villista. The Mexicans retreat, giving the Lakota a chance to regroup and split into two groups. Later, the Lakota accompanying Crazy Horse steps on a twig, alerting the Villistas to their position. He is quickly killed. Crazy Horse, having escaped the area in camouflage, takes out one of the Villistas with his Bisley.

Elsewhere, Pancoe and the final two Villistas clash with the second Lakota group. One of the Lakota is killed; during the ensuing shootout, Crazy Horse appears and kills the Villista, but runs out of ammo before he can kill Villa himself. The remaining Villista takes down the final Lakota with his bolo knife before Crazy Horse takes him down with his war club. Villa attempts to fire but finds his revolver has run out of ammo. Crazy Horse hits him with his club and Villa draws his bolo knife, which he uses to force Crazy Horse to the ground. The club breaks. Crazy Horse manages to get back to his feet and tries to stab Villa with the club's splintered handle but is fatally stabbed in the chest.

Winner: Pancho Villa

== Episode 31: French Foreign Legion vs. Gurkhas ==
	French Foreign Legion	Gurkhas
Team	Cpl. Nick Hughes (retired FFL recon diver and commando); Geoff Wawro (French Foreign Legion historian)	Sgt. Rastra Rai (retired career Gurkha soldier); Lt. John Conlin (retired Gurkha Commander)
Weapons	Camillus, MAS-36 Rifle, Browning Automatic Rifle	Kukri, Enfield No. 4 Rifle, Bren Light Machine Gun
Tactics	Active Defense	Improvised Ambush
Psychological Warfare X-Factor	87	85
Discipline X-Factor	76	88
Training X-Factor	90	87
Physicality X-Factor	84	91
Audacity X-Factor	88	81
Tenacity X-Factor	79	83
Warrior	5'8", 155 pounds c. 1940-45, aged 27	5'3", 135 pounds c. 1940-45, aged 19

This is the first episode to feature warriors fighting under a country other than their native one: the Gurkhas fight for the United Kingdom and the Legion is open to foreigners who want to serve France. The French Foreign Legion is thus the second warrior group in the series composed of different nationalities. Even though both fighting forces still exist today, this match puts them both in World War II due to their reputation during that period. That makes this the fourth match-up where the opponents are contemporaneous allies (they both fought for the Allies during World War II).

The rate of fatigue for the French Foreign Legion was 10.9%, and 5.02% for the Gurkhas. This was factored in due to the legendary regimens of each warrior. The Legionaries brutally train in the desert, complete with severe corporal punishment and the world's highest training mortality rate. The Gurkhas are physiologically less susceptible to fatigue due to the high altitude mountainous environment in which they live, strengthening their legs from incessant high incline traversal and lessening their dependence on oxygen after generations of exposure to the thin mountain air. A bonus clip available on the network's website showcases additional X-Factors that went into the simulator.

Simulation results
	French Foreign Legion	Percentage	Gurkhas	Percentage	Notes
Short Range Weapons	Camillus	44%	Kukri	56%	The knives were tested in eliminating three targets (two guards, one pop-up). Although both weapons scored three kills, with the camillus having a higher strike force of 81 mph to the kukri's 59 mph, the edge was given to the kukri for its larger blade.
Mid Range Weapons	MAS-36 Rifle	42%	Enfield No. 4 Rifle	58%	The rifles were tested in terminal ballistics and in eliminating five targets (three moving, two static) with 20 rounds. In the first test, the MAS-36 had a muzzle velocity of 2647fps compared to 2417fps for the Lee–Enfield No.4. In the second test, both rifles had a 5/5 kill ratio with the Lee–Enfield No.4 scoring a 13/20 hit ratio in 2:07 and the MAS-36 scoring a 14/20 hit ratio in 2:54. The edge was given to the Lee–Enfield No.4 for its faster reload and longer range.
Long Range Weapons	Browning Automatic Rifle	65%	Bren Light Machine Gun	35%	The guns were tested in eliminating three targets at 25, 50, and 100 yards. The Browning completed the test in 58 seconds while the Bren completed the test in 53 seconds but jammed once. The edge was given to the Browning for its mechanical reliability, lighter weight, smaller recoil, and longer range.
Totals	2,381	47.62%	2,619	52.38%	

Reenactment 31

During a shift change at the Legionaire sentry, a Gurkha leader cuts a hole in the campsite's barbed wire fence and takes aim with his Enfield No. 4 rifle. He fires, alerting the five Legionaires. The French fire back at the five Gurkhas with MAS-36 rifles and BAR machine guns. The French sentry tries to leave his post but is shot down in the crossfire, while another Legionaire takes down a Gurkha with his MAS. The Gurkhas advance and two enter the campsite over the barbed wire barricade. A Gurkha is killed by a Legionaire when his Bren machine gun jams, but the Frenchman is quickly taken out by another Gurkha. Another Gurkha is shot while inspecting tents in the campsite and his killer is subsequently shot dead. The remaining two Legionaires fire at the Gurkhas, who retreat before splitting up. One Legionaire is killed when a Gurkha's kukri cuts through his kepi and penetrates his skull; the other Gurkha is killed with a Camillus. The two group leaders face off, both armed with knives. Eventually, the Gurkha gains the upper hand and slashes the Legionaire's throat with his kukri.

Winner: Gurkhas

== Episode 32: Vampires vs. Zombies ==
	Vampires	Zombies
Team	Steve Niles (screenwriter, 30 Days of Night); Scott Bowen (author, The Vampire Survival Guide)	Max Brooks (author, World War Z); Matt Mogk (founder, Zombie Research Society)
Weapons	Bite, claws	Bite, hands
Intelligence X-Factor	93	9
Feeding Instinct X-Factor	82	88
Endurance X-Factor	87	100
Brutality X-Factor	88	96

This is the only episode to feature fictional entities, as well as the only episode to not use weapons, with the warriors themselves being considered the weapons. The creatures featured mirror the 30 Days of Night apex predator vampires and the Night of the Living Dead slow-moving zombies; clips of both films were seen multiple times throughout the episode. The established rules used in this episode are that the zombie virus has the potential to spread to a vampire, sunlight will affect the vampires, the vampires can only be killed by removing/destroying its head or heart or by bleeding out, and the zombies can only be killed by destroying the brain.

To determine how many zombies a vampire could kill before getting overrun, Leif Becker, expert martial artist and world champion speed board breaker, tested metal claw gauntlets designed by Dave Baker to simulate a vampire's razor-sharp claws. He was surrounded by 12 zombie dummies on pulleys, and ripped apart 9 out of the 12 zombies targets. Multiplied by 6 (to simulate the Vampire's superior strength and speed), that would be 54 zombies killed out of 72, with an average of 63, resulting in the ratio of zombies to vampires (63 to 1). This is the first simulated battle where one team has a numerical advantage (3 Vampires vs. 189 Zombies), the first to have a granular appearance (so as to create the classic horror film look), the second to have kills with unlisted techniques (the vampires throw and stomp zombies to death), the second to use slow motion, and the third to have a female play a role. It is also the longest running battle of the show, clocking at 3:36.

This is the only episode to end in a cliffhanger. Although the vampires won in the simulation, the head vampire was shown succumbing to the effects of the zombie virus at the end of the show (stemming from his earlier exposure to zombie fluids), ending in the words "to be continued." This is the final episode before the show's cancellation.

Simulation results
	Vampires	Percentage	Zombies	Percentage	Notes
Short Range Weapons	Bite	5.62%	Bite	2.35%	In order to get a baseline pressure reading, the zombie bite was simulated by a 100 lb Rottweiler, named Joey, that bit down on a load cell hidden in an attack sleeve which resulted in 255 lbs of pressure. For the vampire bite, an alligator, named Ripper, was brought in to chomp down on a 10 lb load cell between two blocks, which resulted in 1,723 lbs of bite force. Then the forces were feed into an automated chomper designed by Geoff, changing the bite force and teeth for each creature. The zombie teeth killed a simulated vampire through bleed-out in 2:22, and the vampire teeth destroyed a zombie brain in five seconds.
Mid Range Weapons	Claws	49.48%	Hands	42.55%	The vampire claw was matched against a horde of zombie hands. For the zombie hands, three world-class strongmen were blindfolded to simulate the zombies' random attack pattern and instructed to rip at a ballistic gel torso until they removed the heart, killing the vampire in 58 seconds. To test the vampire claw, one of the aforementioned strongmen slammed down on a pressure mat; the force generated was thenmultiplied by 6 (to simulate the vampire's super strength), generating a slash force with 8,820 lbs behind it, enough to penetrate a zombie gel head, destroying its brain and killing it in 1.07 seconds.
Totals	2,541	50.82%	2,459	49.18%	

Reenactment

189 zombies search for a food source inside an abandoned warehouse. Outside, three vampires rise from their coffins and split up, also in search of food. One of the male vampires comes into contact with a group of zombies, managing to down two of them before he is forced to retreat. He attempts to leave the area but finds himself surrounded. He takes down 76 more zombies before being killed. The other two vampires hear his cries and arrive at the warehouse, where they encounter the horde of zombies. The remaining zombies pursue the vampires through the warehouse. The vampires take down 60 zombies before the female is killed. The vampire leader continues fighting, killing six more before he slows down from fatigue, though he manages to break free of their hold and kill five more. He attempts to escape but retreats back into the warehouse when he realizes dawn is breaking outside. He then kills the remaining 39 zombies before realizing that he had been bitten and starts to become a zombie-vampire hybrid. The ending is left ambiguous.

Winner: Vampires
