= LWRC PSD =

LWRC International semi-automatic 5.56mm pistol

LWRC PSD Pistol
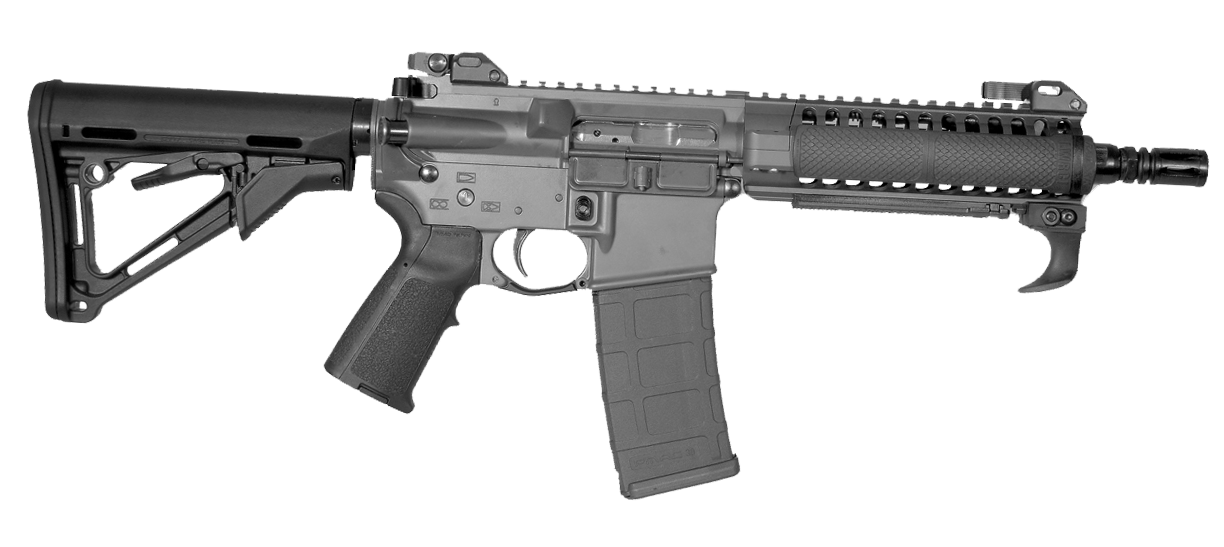
- LWRC PSD (Personal Security Detail)
- Type: PSD Pistol
- Place of origin: United States

Production history
- Designed: 2006
- Manufacturer: LWRC International
- Unit cost: $2,319.48

Specifications
- Mass: 5.9 lb (2.7 kg)
- Length: 21.25 in (54.0 cm)
- Caliber: 5.56 NATO and 6.8 mm
- Barrels: 8.5 in (22 cm)
- Action: Short stroke gas piston
- Sights: LWRCI Skirmish Sights

The LWRC PSD Pistol and the IC-PSD are both semi-automatic 5.56 NATO caliber pistols manufactured by LWRC International. Another PSD, the SIX8-Pistol, is a 6.8mm Remington SPC on the same PSD platform.

== Design details ==
The gun was designed to be a personal security detail pistol. The LWRC pistol accepts a 5.56 NATO cartridge. It has a 8.5 in (22 cm) barrel and weighs 5.9 lb (2.7 kg). The gun has a short-stroke gas piston system. The barrel has a 1:7 twist and is treated with Black Nitride.

== Operation ==
The PSD is an AR-15 style pistol which uses the same platform as the AR-15. The platform allows uppers to be switched and the lower receiver is the same specifications as the AR-15. It is fitted with LWRCI's flip-up iron sights and the controls are ambidextrous. The gun has MIAD pistol grip and the trigger pull measures 7.5 pounds. Because of the way the gun can be easily concealed, it is used by security details.
