= PMD series mines =

Soviet Union anti-personnel mines

PMD
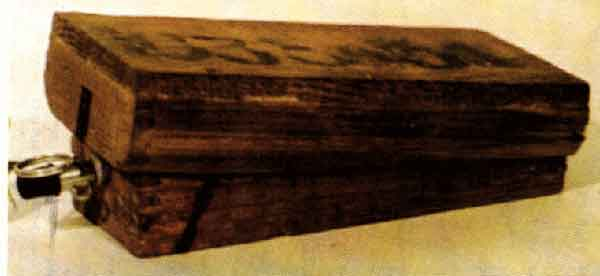
- A PMD-6
- Type: Anti-personnel mine
- Place of origin: Soviet Union

Service history
- Used by: See users
- Wars: World War II; Myanmar conflict; Korean War; Vietnam War; Portuguese Colonial War; Eritrean War of Independence; North Yemen civil war; Aden Emergency; Rhodesian Bush War; Cambodian Civil War; Angolan Civil War; Nicaraguan Revolution; Soviet-Afghan War; First Nagorno-Karabakh War; Gulf War; Tajik Civil War; Yemeni civil war (1994); First Congo War

Production history
- Variants: See variants

Specifications (PMD-6)
- Mass: 400 g (14 oz)
- Length: 190 mm (7.5 in)
- Width: 90 mm (3.5 in)
- Height: 65 mm (2.6 in)
- Filling: TNT
- Filling weight: 200 g (7.1 oz)
- Detonation mechanism: Pressure or tripwire

The PMD-6, PMD-7 and PMD-57 series mines are Soviet Union blast-type anti-personnel mines that consist of a wooden box with a hinged lid with a slot cut into it. The slot presses down against a retaining pin, which holds back the striker. When sufficient pressure is applied to the lid of the box the retaining pin moves, allowing the striker to hit the detonator. The mines typically have an operating pressure of 1 to 10 kg.

Due its minimal use of metal, it was virtually indetectable by 1940s metal detectors, but by the late 1990s it could be located at a range of 30 m (98 ft) with a Ebinger 420 or other contemporary detectors. As with other wooden box mines, the mine has a relatively short lifetime since the box is vulnerable to rotting and splitting, disabling the mine. In dry climates however, PMD-6s were found in operational condition up to ten years after being laid.

The mines are sometimes used with mortar bombs in place of the normal explosive blocks.

== Variants ==
- PMD-6 − original version of the mine, first used in the 1939 Winter War between the Soviet Union and Finland.
- PMD-6M − slightly larger version of the mine, with a leaf spring installed inside the box to increase operating pressure, which allows safer handling during minelaying.
- PMD-6F − a version used extensively during the Siege of Leningrad, with an ammonium nitrate/fuel oil (ANFO) main charge.
- PMD-7 − smaller version of the mine, using a cylindrical main charge.
- PMD-7ts − consists of a solid wooden block hollowed out to accept the main charge and fuse.
- PMD-57 − A later, larger box mine, using a larger warhead.
- Type 59 − Chinese copy
- PP Mi-D − Czech copy
- PMD-1 − Yugoslav copy

Due the mine simple construction and to evade the arms embargo, Rhodesia produced copies of the PMD-6 during the Rhodesian Bush War.

== Specifications ==
	PMD-6	PMD-6M	PMD-7	PMD-7ts	PMD-57
Weight	460 g	490 g	400 g (approx)	400 g	
Explosive content	200 g	200 g	75 or 200 g	50 or 75 g	400 g
Length	190 mm	200 mm	152 mm		200 mm
Width	90 mm	90 mm	76 mm		100 mm
Height	45 mm	50 mm	51 mm		80 mm
Operating pressure	1 to 12 kg	6 to 28 kg	1 to 9 kg		19 kg

== Users ==
- Afghanistan
- Albania − PMD-6 produced locally until 1991. Stockpiles destroyed in 2002
- Algeria − PMD-6 and PMD-6M, used for training only
- Angola − PMD-6, used for training only
- Armenia
- China − Produced locally as the Type 59
- Congo-Kinshasa − PMD-6, used for training only
- Czechoslovakia − Produced locally as the PP Mi-D
- Ecuador − PMD-6M. Stockpiles destroyed in 2002
- Eritrea − PMD-6, seized from Ethiopian depots or minefields
- Ethiopia
- Iraq − PMD-6
- Guinea-Bissau − PMD-6
- North Korea − PMD-6
- Mozambique − PMD-6
- Myanmar − PMD-6
- Namibia
- Nepal − PMD-6
- Nicaragua − PMD-6M. Stockpiles destroyed between 1999 and 2002
- Peru − PMD-6 and PMD-6M, used for training only
- Poland − PMD-6 produced locally until 1957, remaining stockpiles used for training only
- Rhodesia − Locally produced copies of the PMD-6
- Soviet Union − Replaced by the PMN in the early 1960s
- Tajikistan − PMD-6
- Turkmenistan
- Uganda − PMD-6 produced locally
- Yemen − PMD-6, used for training only
- Yugoslavia − Produced locally as the PMD-1

=== Non-state actors ===
- Contras− PMD-6
- Khmer Rouge − PMD-6
- Viet Cong − PMD-6

== See also ==
- Schu-mine 42
