= PP Mi-D mine =

PP Mi-D
- Type: Anti-personnel mine
- Place of origin: Czechoslovakia

Service history
- Used by: See users
- Wars: Angolan War of Independence; South African Border War; Angolan Civil War

Specifications
- Mass: 500 g (18 oz)
- Length: 135 mm (5.3 in)
- Width: 105 mm (4.1 in)
- Height: 55 mm (2.2 in)
- Filling: TNT
- Filling weight: 200 g (7.1 oz)
- Detonation mechanism: Pressure or tripwire

The PP Mi-D mine is a Czechoslovak wooden anti-personnel mine based on the Soviet PMD series.

It consists of a simple wooden box with a hinged lid that acts as the trigger mechanism. A slot is cut into the side of the lid which rests on the striker retaining pin. The main charge is a block of cast TNT into which a variety of fuzes may be placed, typically either the RO-1 or an MUV series fuze.

The mine is triggered by pressure on the lid forcing the retaining pin out of the striker which then hits the detonator. It can be used with a tripwire connected to the fuze acting as a crude anti-handling device.

There are also sometimes two holes drilled in the front of the box that accept wooden pins, either to prevent accidental detonation when laying or to increase the operating pressure.

The wooden construction of the mine results in a short field life, with the box rotting or splitting preventing the mine from functioning. The metal fuze however, can remain operational for a long time making it dangerous to handle.

== Specifications ==
- Height:
  - With fuze: 72 mm
  - Without fuze: 59 mm
- Width: 102 mm
- Length: 136 mm
- Weight: 500 g
- Explosive content: 200 g of TNT
- Sensitivity: 1 to 10 kg

== Users ==
- Angola
- Czechoslovakia
- Czech Republic
- Namibia
- Slovakia
