= Sagaris =

Ancient Iranian shafted weapon

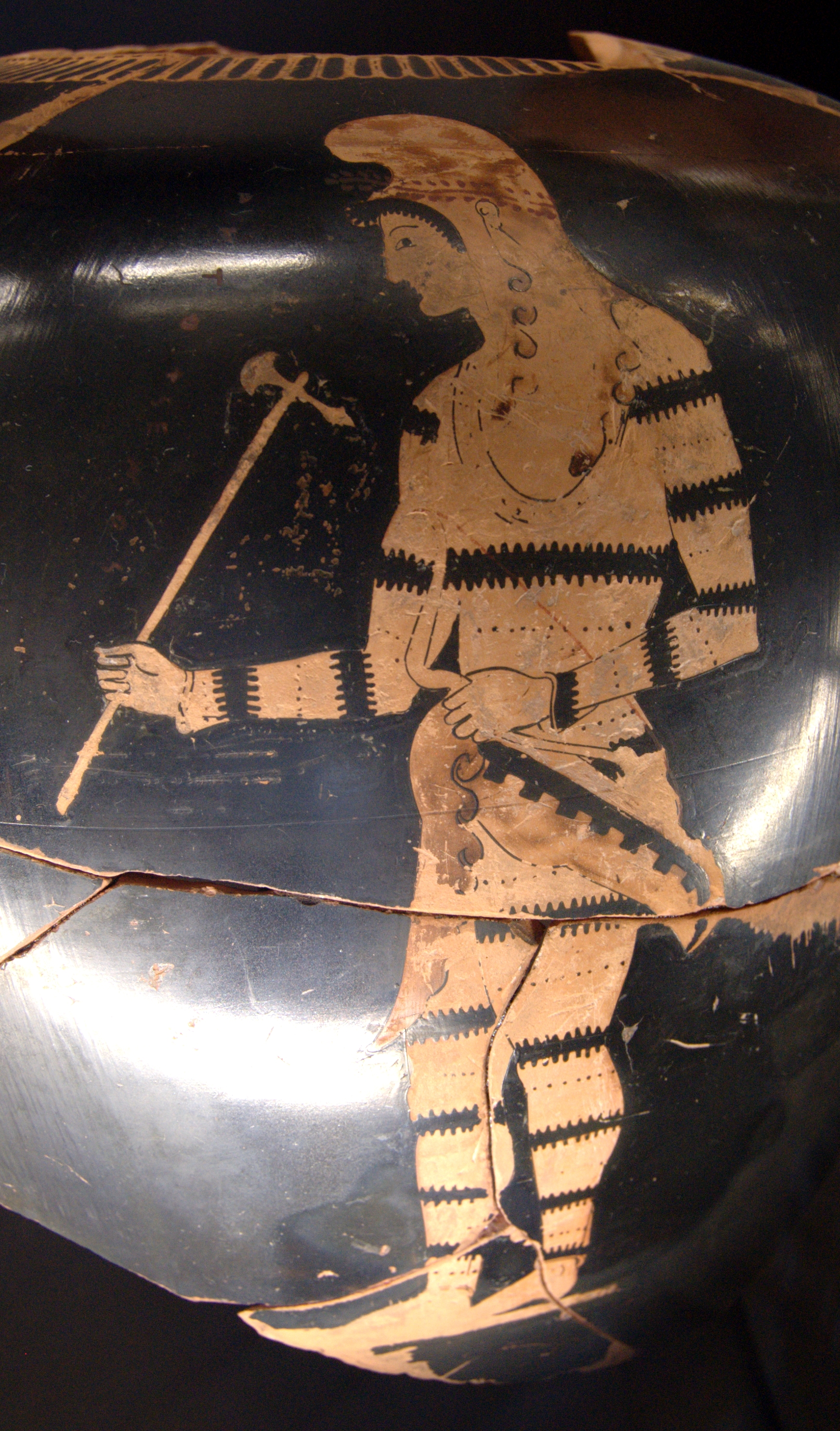
Scythian archer holding a sagaris, as depicted by the vase-painter Euphronios on an Attic red-figure neck amphora (510–500 BC, Louvre)

The sagaris (Ancient Greek: Σάγαρις and Σάγαρι) is an ancient shafted weapon used by the horse-riding ancient Saka and Scythian peoples of the great Eurasian steppe. It was used also by Western and Central Asian peoples: the Medes, Persians, Parthians, Indo-Saka, Kushans, Mossynoeci, and others living within the milieu of Iranian peoples. Sagaris is also the etymological origin of the Slavic word for "axe". According to Aristarchus of Samothrace, the legendary Amazons used the sagaris, as well. In The Histories, Herodotus attributes the sagaris to the Sacae Scythians in the army-list of Xerxes the Great.

The sagaris was a kind of battle-axe, or sometimes war hammer. Examples have been collected from Eurasian steppe archeological excavations, and are depicted on the Achaemenid cylinders and ancient Greek pottery and other surviving iconographic material. It is a long-shafted weapon with a metal head, with an either sharp (axe-like) or blunt (hammer-like) edge on one side and a sharp (straight or curving) 'ice-pick'-like point on the other. It may have been the sagaris that led medieval and Renaissance authors (such as Johannes Aventinus) to attribute the invention of the battle-axe weapon to the Amazons, and to the modern association of the Amazons with the labrys.

A shorter form, as depicted in the hand of Spalirises on his coins, was labelled klevets by Russian archaeologist and ancient military historian V.P. Nikonorov.

The skulls of buried Scythian horses of older age are often found with damage that suggests they were killed by a blow to the mid forehead with the pointed part of the sagaris, possibly as a form of euthanasia. It is possible that this method of execution may have held some sort of cultural importance considering the great significance of horses in Scythian life.

Archaeological evidence suggests that the sagaris was used by both female and male Scythian warriors. Pointed axes and axe-heads appear as grave goods in Scythian and Saka burials, while traumatic injuries found on a number of Scythian warriors' skulls (including the skull of one of three armed females in a grave dating to circa 1000 BCE discovered near Tbilisi, Georgia) indicate they were struck down with weapons of this type.

It has been noted that significant forearm strength is not required to inflict serious injury with a sagaris.
