= Mambele =

African hybrid knife/axe

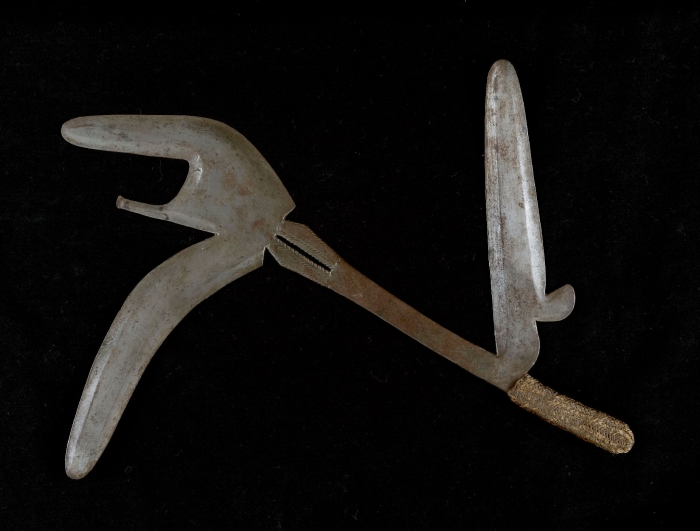
- Example of a Kpinga of the Nzakara and Zande people
- Type: Knife, axe

Service history
- Used by: Mangbetu, Nzakara, Zande, Bagirmi, Marghi, Musgum

Production history
- Developed from: Throwing knife

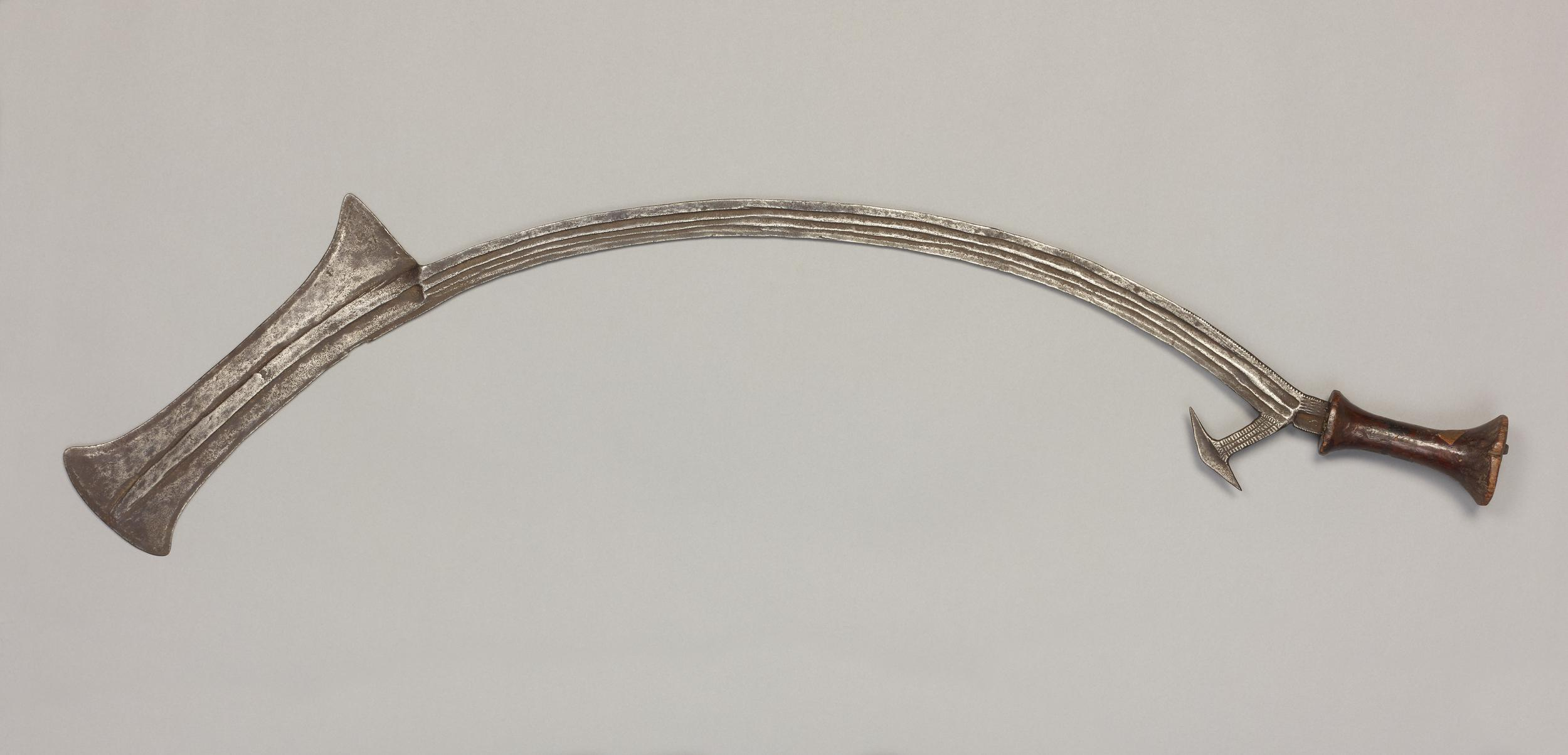
A mambele sickle sword at the British Museum.

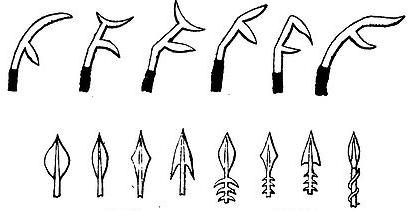
Variations of the mambele across the top row

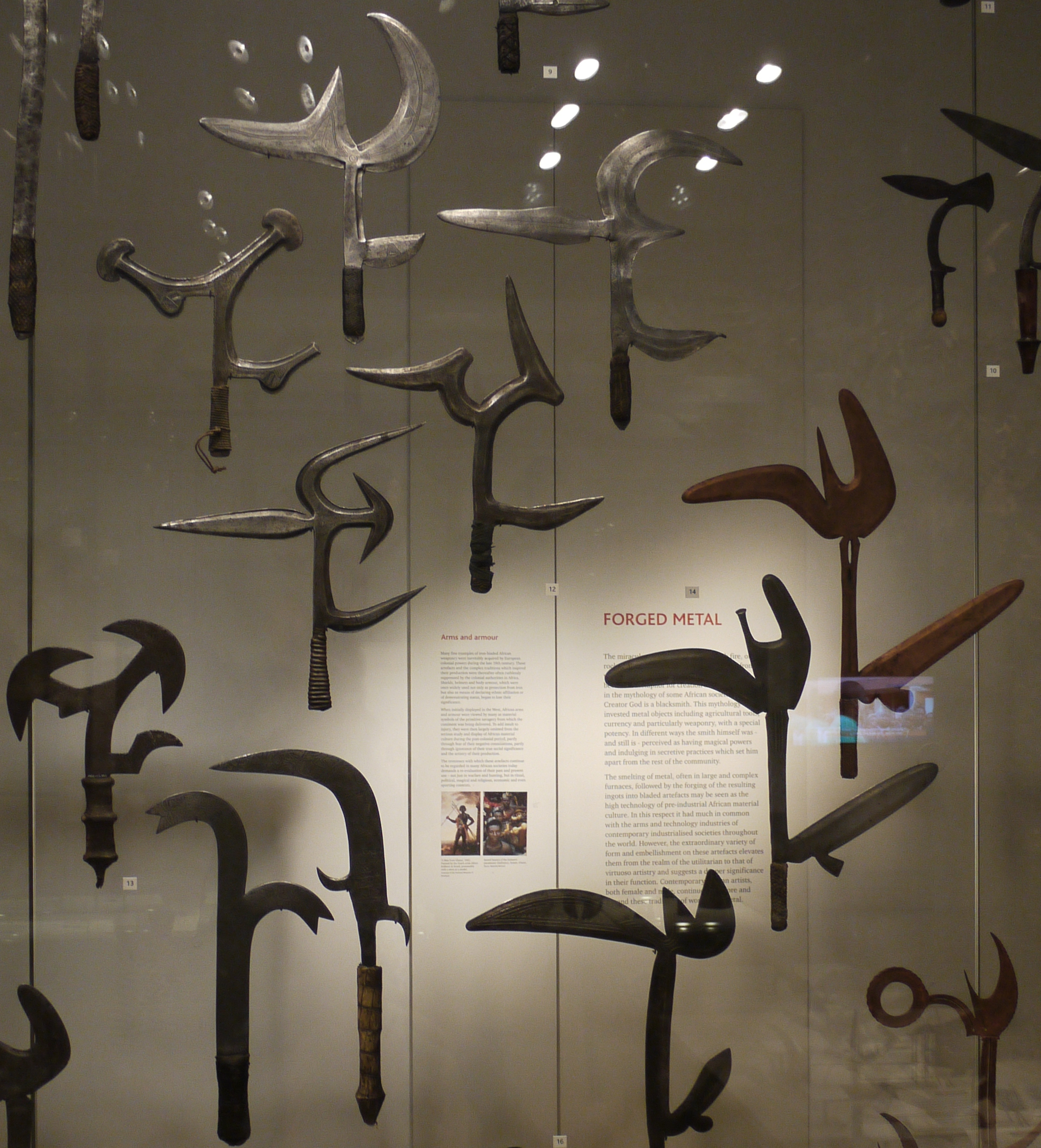
A selection of African throwing knives in the British Museum

A mambele is a form of hybrid knife/axe used in central and southern Africa, originating from a curved throwing dagger used by the Mangbetu.

== Description ==
The mambele consists of an iron blade with a curved back section and rearward spike. It can be used in close combat as a hatchet or dagger, or more typically as a throwing weapon. It usually consists of four blades, three on top and one on the side. The curved hook was used to keep the weapon in the victim, and if pulled out, caused further damage. It is typically about 56 cm (22 in) in length. These African iron weapons are thrown with a rotatory motion, and can inflict deep wounds with their projecting blades.

The mambele is also known as:

- Hunga munga by the Mambele
- Danisco by the Marghi
- Goleyo by the Musgum
- Njiga by the Bagirmi
- Kpinga by the Zande. They were classed as "Court Metal", being produced under the patronage of the Avongara clan, distributed only to professional warriors, and considered status symbols. It was also part of the dowry that a man ought to pay to the bride's family. Soldiers would carry three or four into battle, hidden behind their shields. They were typically thrown at the enemy from 9 m (30 ft) away.

They vary constantly in form and their use extends across Africa, from the Upper Nile on the east through Central Africa and over to Gabon in West Africa. The "musri" or "mouzeri" throwing knife of the Teda people in the central Sahara is a variant. In parts of Central Africa these weapons assume the form of a bird's head.

== See also ==
- Tomahawk
