= Flipper =

Flipper may refer to:

== Common meanings ==
- Flipper (anatomy), a forelimb of an aquatic animal, useful for steering and/or propulsion in water
- Swimfins, footwear that boosts human swimming efficiency, also known as flippers
- Flipper (cricket), a type of delivery bowled by a wrist spin bowler
- Flipper (pinball), a part of a pinball machine used to strike the ball
- A speculator who engages in flipping (buying and selling quickly)
- Flipper (tool), used for flipping food over while cooking

== Film and television ==
- Flipper (franchise), a multimedia franchise about a bottlenose dolphin named Flipper
  - Flipper (1963 film)
  - Flipper's New Adventure (1964), sequel to the 1963 film
  - Flipper (1996 film), a remake of the 1963 film starring Paul Hogan and Elijah Wood
  - Flipper (1964 TV series), an adaptation of the 1963 film which originally ran from 1964 to 1967
  - Flipper (1995 TV series), a revival of the 1964 series which ran from 1995 to 2000
  - Flipper, one of the title characters of the Australian animated series Flipper & Lopaka

== Music ==
- Die Flippers, a German Schlager group
  - Die Flippers (album), the group's first studio album, released in 1970
- Flipper (band), a punk band from San Francisco, California
- Flipper, a former member of the lesbian punk band Tribe 8

== Military ==
- Operation Flipper, a British World War II commando raid with the goal of assassinating Erwin Rommel
- Flipper, NATO reporting name of the Mikoyan-Gurevich Ye-152A Soviet fighter aircraft
- M138 "Flipper" portable mine layer, see GEMSS mine system

== People ==
- Henry Ossian Flipper (1856–1940), first African-American cadet to graduate from West Point
- Willie Flipper Anderson (born 1965), former National Football League wide receiver
- Kirsten Flipkens (born 1986), Belgian tennis player
- Leandro Ruiz Machado (born 1977), Brazilian water polo player
- Carmen Milano (1929–2006), American disbarred lawyer and mobster

== Other uses ==
- Flipper (mascot), Miami Dolphins mascot from 1966 to 1968
- Flipper (US dinghy), an American sailing dinghy design
- Flipper (Danish dinghy), a Danish sailing dinghy design
- Flipper (robot combat), a device used to flip over opposing robots
- the ATI-produced Graphics Processing Unit chip used in the Nintendo GameCube videogame console

== See also ==
- Flip (disambiguation)
