= T. D. (mascot) =

Mascot for the NFL's Miami Dolphins

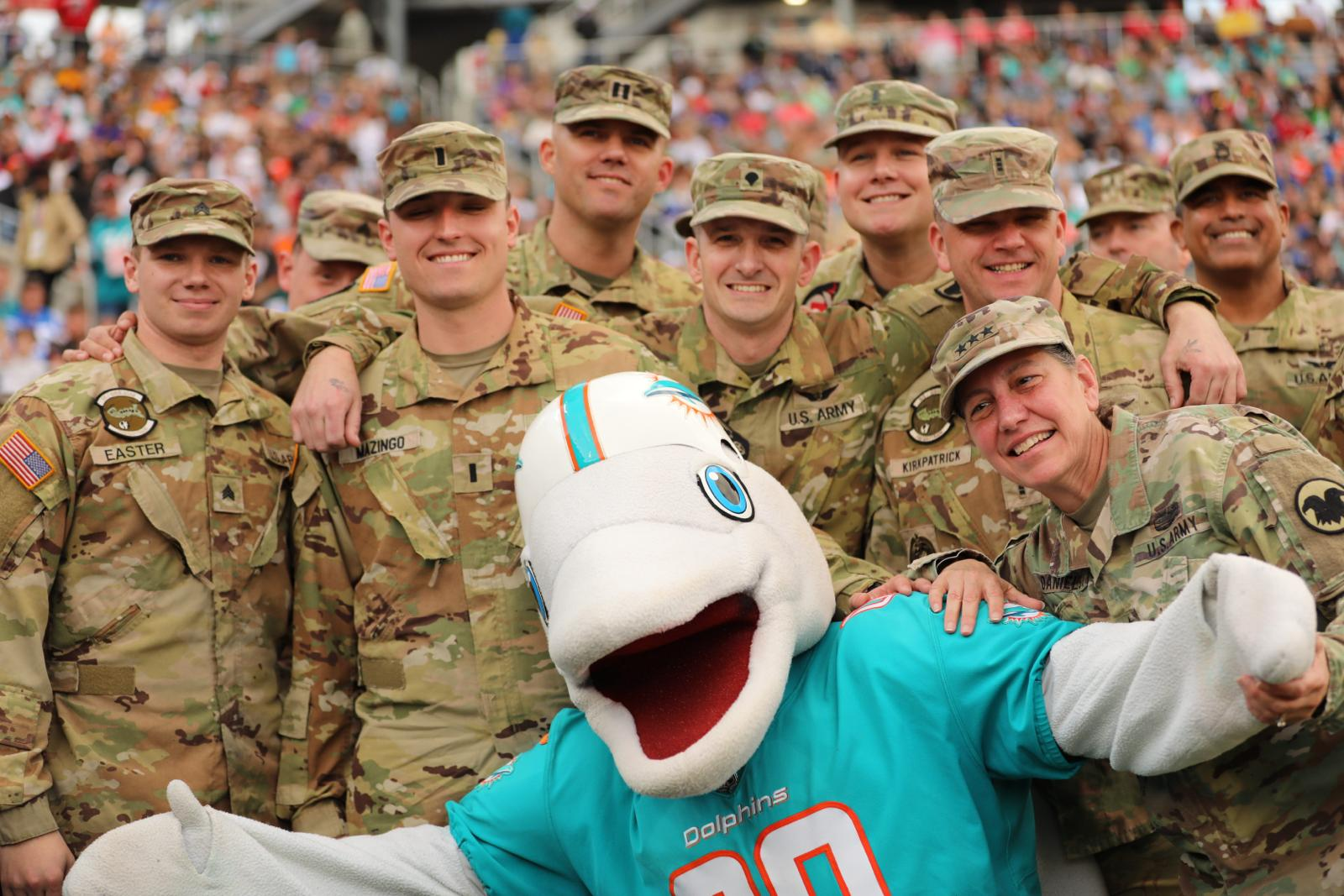
T. D. at the 2024 Pro Bowl Games.

T.D. (for The Dolphin, but also a pun because T.D. is short for touchdown) is the official mascot of the National Football League's Miami Dolphins. The Dolphins' official website jokingly states that T.D. was signed on April 18, 1997 by former head coach Jimmy Johnson. The Dolphins conducted a "Name the Mascot" contest that drew over 13,000 entries, covering all 50 states and 22 countries. 528 names were suggested and the winning entry was announced at the annual Dolphins Awards Banquet on June 4, 1997. T.D. first appeared at a Dolphins home game on August 10, 1997 against the Chicago Bears; his first Dolphins home playoff appearance was January 2, 1999 in a win against the Buffalo Bills. He was selected to the Pro Bowl in 1999, 2001, 2003, 2004, 2010, 2012, 2014, 2016, and was the first NFL mascot to participate in the Hall of Fame Game in Canton, Ohio in 2001. He was invited to Hong Kong to participate in the 2005 Chinese New Year's Day Parade, and recently on May 2, 2015, T.D. was invited to participate at 2015 NFL draft Town in Chicago, Illinois.

== See also ==
- Flipper (mascot)
- Ace Ventura: Pet Detective
