= Flippin =

Flippin may refer to:

- Flippin, Arkansas, United States
- Flippin, Kentucky
- Flippin (surname), an American surname

== See also ==
- Flippin–Lodge angle
- Flipping
- Flip (disambiguation)
