= GEMSS mine system =

American mine-laying system

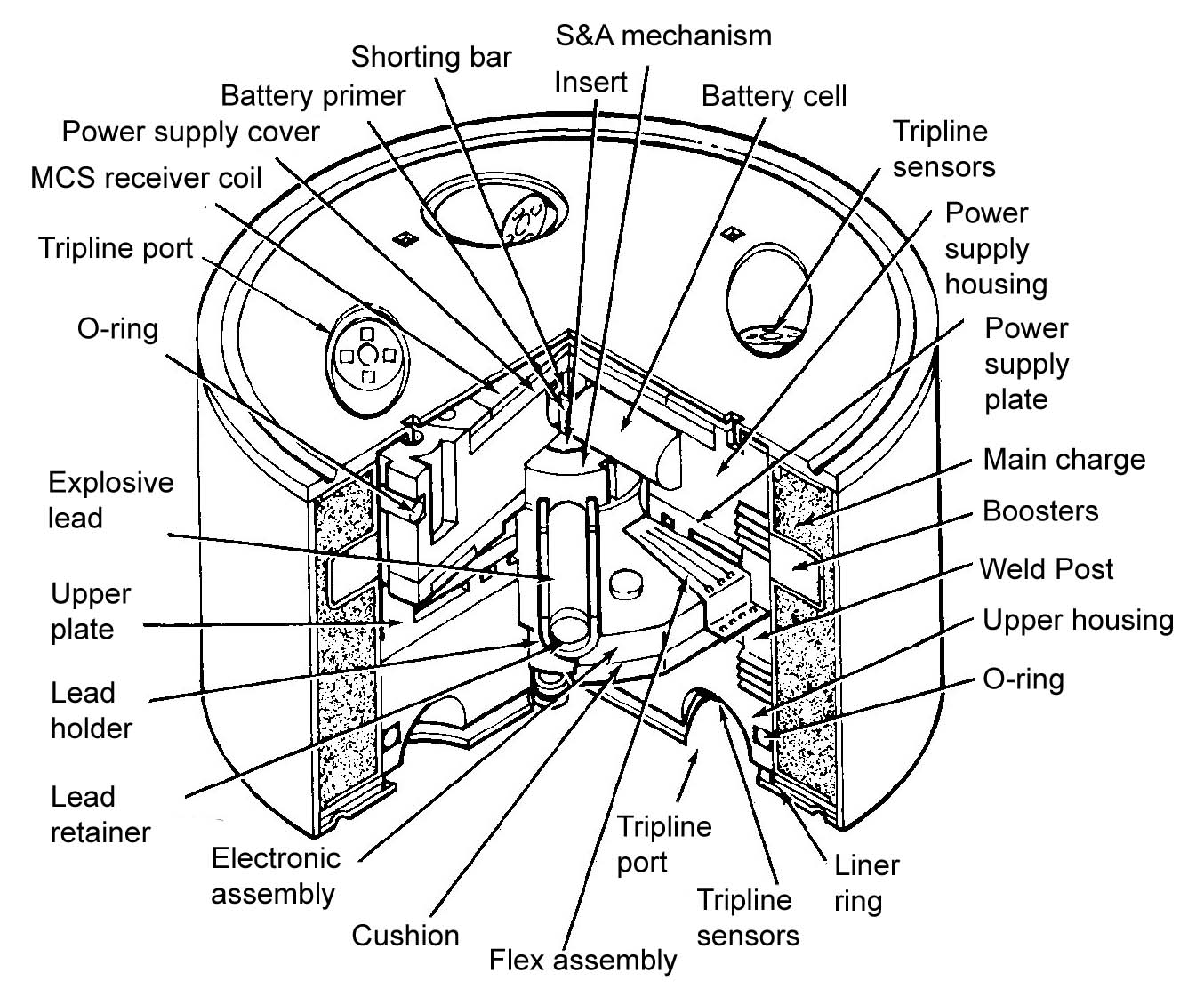
M74 AP mine.

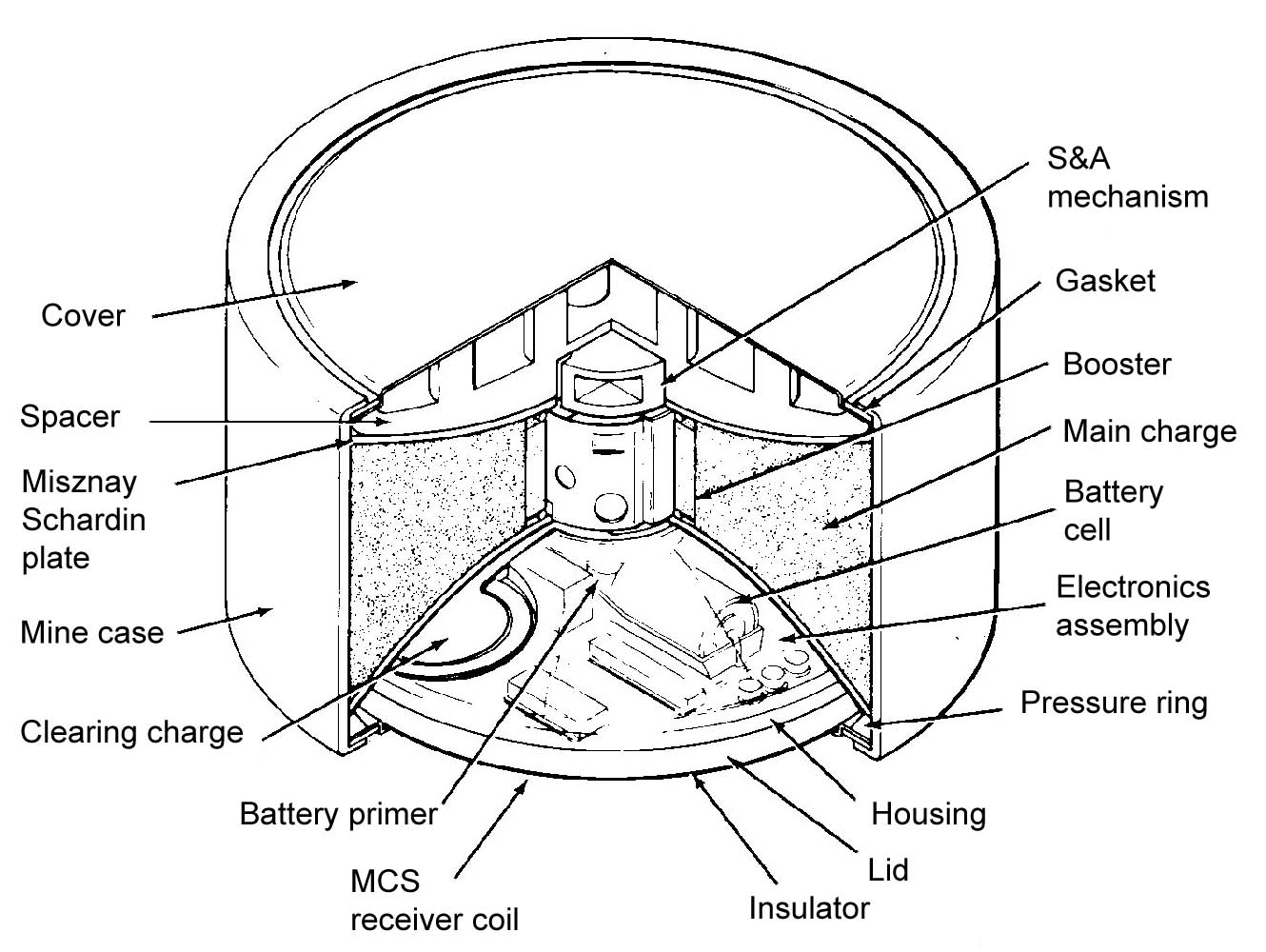
M75 AT mine.

The GEMSS mine system (Ground Emplaced Mine Scattering System) was a United States mine-laying system, part of the Family of Scatterable Mines used to rapidly emplace large tactical minefields in friendly territory. It consisted of two different types of dispensers, the towed M128 "Frisbee Flinger" and the auxiliary M138 "Flipper" portable mine layer, and deployed mines similar to those used in the GATOR mine system minus the aeroballistic casing. GEMSS was eventually replaced in US service by the Volcano mine system.

== Operation ==
The M128, fitted on a modified M794 trailer, first entered service in 1986. With an empty weight of 4,733kg, when fully loaded with 800 mines (a process which could take up to 20 minutes) the system weighed 6,364kg. Typical loadout consisted of 666 anti-tank (AT) mines and 124 anti-personnel (AP) mines. The M128 could be towed by a variety of wheeled or tracked prime movers. One M128 was issued to each combat engineer company operating with heavy forces. Over the course of 25 minutes, an M128 could lay three rows of mines, each 888 meters long and 60 meters wide, separated by two lanes each 50–100 meters in width. The area density was .005 mines per square meter, with a linear density of .75 AT land mines per meter of front.

The M138 "Flipper" was introduced in 1991 as a supplemental system to the M128. Weighing 55kg, the unit could be mounted to any vehicle in about ten minutes. Four Flippers were assigned to each unit with an M128, or to platoons operating as part of light forces. Three Flippers operating together could lay a minefield of the same size and density as one laid by an M128 in the same amount of time.

== Mines ==
GEMSS deployed two types mines, the M74 anti-personnel (AP) mine and the M75 anti-tank (AT) mine, along with an inert M79 practice mine. All three were the same size with a diameter of 199mm and height of 66mm.

The M74 mine weighed 3.1 lb (1.4 kg) in total with an explosive weight of .92 lb (0.42 kg). Arming as it travels through the air, the mine would deploy four tripwires when it came to a rest on the ground. The movement of a tripwire or physical disturbance of the mine itself would cause it to explode. Expiration of the self-destruct timer or running out of power would also cause it to explode. For storage and transportation, a sealed container could hold forty mines, divided between eight sleeves, while six containers could fit on a pallet.

The M75 mine was slightly heavier at 4 lb (1.8 kg) total and an explosive weight of 1.29 lb (0.59 kg). In terms of arming, functioning and storage it was the same as the M74, however instead of deploying tripwires it would explode if a vehicle passed over it. Additionally, one in every five M75 was fitted with an antidisturbance switch.
