= Flip-flop =

Flip-flops are a simple type of footwear in which there is a band between the big toe and the other toes.

Flip-flop may also refer to:

== Entertainment ==
- Flip-Flop (album), a 1989 album by Guadalcanal Diary
- Flip-Flop (audio drama), a 2003 audio drama based on the British television series Doctor Who
- "Flip-Flop" (Will & Grace), an episode of the television series Will & Grace
- Flip Flop (Modern Family), an episode of the television series Modern Family
- Flip Flop (The Price Is Right), a game on The Price Is Right
- "Flip Flop", a song by Megan Thee Stallion from the album Traumazine, 2022
- Flip and Flop, a 1983 video game
- Flip or Flop, a U.S. television series on HGTV

== Computers and electronics ==
- Flip-flop (electronics), a circuit with two stable states
- Flip-flop (programming), a Boolean expression with persistent state and two conditions

== Sports ==
- A back handspring (gymnastics)
- A trick performed in the sport of freestyle kayaking (Playboating)

== Other uses ==
- Flip (algebraic geometry) and flop, operations in algebraic geometry
- Flip-flop (politics), a sudden change of position on an issue
- Flip-flop hub, a type of hub used in bicycle wheels
- Flip–flop kinetics, a phenomenon in pharmacokinetics when a drug is released at a sustained rate instead of immediate release
- A common name of the African wood white butterfly (Leptosia alcesta)
- Flip flop, per top, bottom and versatile, a role reversal between two men during a single sexual encounter
- The translocation of a phospholipid in cell membranes carried out by flippase proteins

== See also ==
- Flippity and Flop, a pair of cartoon characters that appeared in theatrical shorts, 1945–1947
- Flip (disambiguation)
- Flop (disambiguation)
