= Floop =

Floop may refer to:

- FlooP, a programming language
- Fegan Floop, a character in the Spy Kids series of films
- FLOOPS, Florida Object Oriented Process Simulator, in semiconductor process simulation
- Floops, a cartoon character created for the VRML language at SGI website
- Floop, an application for students to receive feedback on things like essays

== See also ==
- Flop (disambiguation)
