= Flip (nickname) =

As a nickname, Flip may refer to:

- Flip Benham (born 1948), American evangelical Christian minister and anti-abortion leader
- Flip Cornett (1957–2004), American funk guitarist and bassist
- Andrew Filipowski (born 1950), Polish-American technology entrepreneur
- Flip Fraser (1951–2014), born Peter Randolph Fraser, Jamaican-British journalist and playwright
- Flip Johnson (born 1963), American retired National Football League player
- Flip Kowlier (born 1976), Belgian singer-songwriter
- Flip Lafferty (1854–1910), American Major League Baseball player
- Flip Mark (born 1948), American former child actor
- Ronald Murray (born 1979), American former National Basketball Association player
- Flip Nicklin (born 1948), American whale photographer
- Joseph "Flip" Nuñez (1931–1995), American jazz musician of Filipino descent
- Flip Phillips (1915–2001), American jazz tenor saxophone and clarinet
- Scott Phillips (musician) (born 1973), American drummer for Alter Bridge and Creed
- Al Rosen (1924–2015), American Major League Baseball third baseman
- Flip Saunders (1955–2015), American basketball coach
- Flip Simmons, Australian actor and musician
- Philip Slier (1923–1943), Dutch Jewish diarist and Holocaust victim
- P. F. Sloan (1945–2015), American pop-rock singer and songwriter born Philip Gary Schlein
- Flip van der Merwe (born 1985), South African rugby union footballer
- Willie Williams (murderer) (1956–2005), American mass murderer
- Flip Wilson (1933–1998), American actor and comedian

== See also ==
- Flip (disambiguation)
