= Family of Scatterable Mines =

US armed forces land mine family

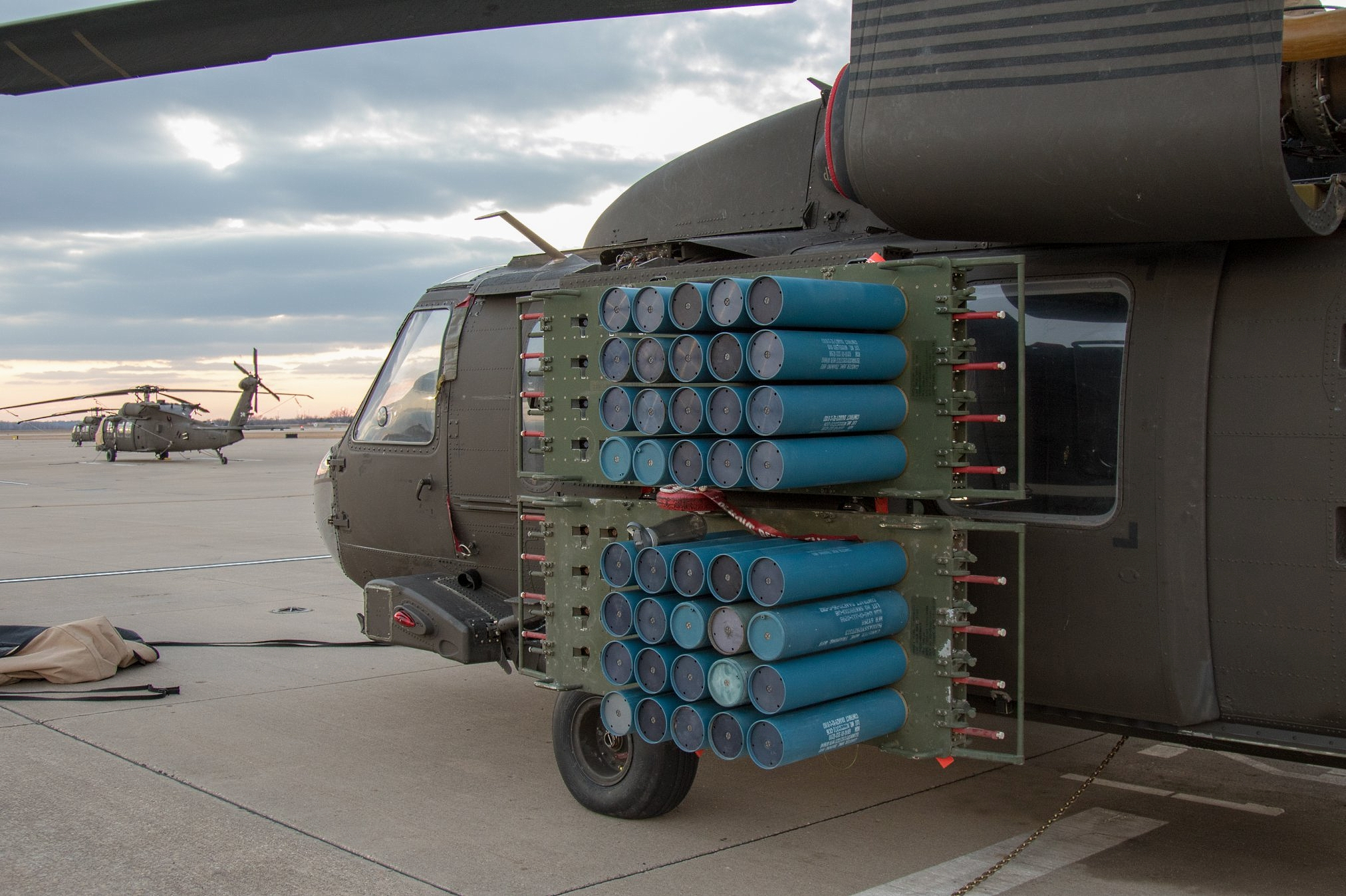
UH-60 Blackhawk with M136 Volcano mine dispensing system

Family of Scatterable Mines (FASCAM) is an umbrella term for a range of systems of the armed forces of the United States, which allows a maneuver commander to rapidly place mines as a situational obstacle; as a reserve obstacle emplacement capability; and to directly attack enemy formations through disrupt, fix, turn, and block. Modern fusing, sensing, and anti-disturbance devices allow scatterable mines to defeat enemy attempts to reduce and/or clear the minefield. FASCAM mines are delivered through artillery, rocket launchers, indirect crew served weapons, special mine sowing vehicles, helicopters and aircraft. FASCAM mines utilize a random or pre-programmed self-destruct period, countermeasure hardening and anti-disturbance features. All FASCAM mines have an active life cycle and self-destruct (SD) time after their active life has expired. The duration of the active life varies from 4 hours to 15 days depending on the system.

Systems that are part of the FASCAM range include:

- Remote Anti-Armor Mine System (RAAMS) (a 155 mm howitzer shell)
- Area Denial Artillery Munition (ADAM) (a 155 mm howitzer shell)
- GATOR mine system (air dropped)
- Volcano mine system (various vehicles)
- GEMSS mine system (various vehicles)
- Modular Pack Mine System (MOPMS) (a manually emplaced mine dispenser consisting of 17 AT and 4 AP mines released on command from a remote control system)
