= MidAmerica Productions =

MidAmerica Productions is an American concert production company founded by conductor and music director Peter Tiboris in 1984. Based in New York City, the company organizes choral and instrumental concerts featuring ensembles, conductors, composers, and soloists from the United States and other countries. Its programs include performances at Carnegie Hall and other major concert venues, as well as international music residencies.

The company has presented more than 1,500 concerts worldwide and has commissioned and presented new works by contemporary composers. Its activities include concert production, international performance residencies, and collaborations with professional orchestras and guest conductors.

== History ==
=== Founding and early years ===
MidAmerica Productions originated with a concert organized and conducted by Peter Tiboris on January 7, 1984, at Alice Tully Hall at Lincoln Center in New York City. The performance featured the American Symphony Orchestra, vocal soloists, and three choruses: the Louisiana Chorale of Acadiana, the Camerata Singers of Baton Rouge, and the Collegiate Chorale of New York. The program included works by contemporary composer Dinos Constantinides.

The concert marked Tiboris' New York conducting debut and became the foundation for the company's subsequent activities. MidAmerica Productions developed a concert series bringing together choral and instrumental ensembles, conductors, and soloists from across the United States and internationally.

=== Carnegie Hall and concert production ===
MidAmerica Productions established a substantial presence at Carnegie Hall, presenting concerts in Stern Auditorium/Perelman Stage, Weill Recital Hall, and Zankel Hall. The company has also presented performances at Lincoln Center and in concert venues in other American cities and abroad.

Its programs encompass choral and orchestral repertoire, chamber music, instrumental performances, and concerts featuring guest conductors and vocal soloists. The company has worked with ensembles of varying sizes and backgrounds, including community, university, church, and international choirs.

=== New England Symphonic Ensemble ===
The New England Symphonic Ensemble (NESE), established in 1989, has been a recurring performing ensemble in MidAmerica Productions' Carnegie Hall concerts and other programs. The orchestra has performed under numerous guest conductors, including Tiboris and Rutter, and has collaborated with international soloists and choral ensembles.

Its repertoire includes standard orchestral and choral-orchestral works as well as contemporary compositions and premieres.

=== International residencies ===
Alongside its New York concert series, MidAmerica Productions organizes international performance residencies for participating choral and instrumental ensembles. These programs combine rehearsals and public performances with opportunities to collaborate with local orchestras and musicians.

Destinations have included Austria, France, Italy, England, Portugal, Sweden, and other countries. Programs have featured performances in major cultural centers, including Vienna, Salzburg, Paris, Florence, London, and Stockholm.

The residencies are designed for ensembles seeking opportunities to perform internationally while engaging with local musical traditions and cultural sites. Depending on the program, packages may include accommodations, rehearsals, local transportation, cultural excursions, and performances with professional orchestras.

== Commissions and premieres ==
MidAmerica Productions has presented new works and premiere performances as part of its concert programming. Recent partnerships and collaborations have included Sir John Rutter, Dinos Constantinides, Marc-André Bougie, Michael J. Glasgow, Terre Johnson, Michael John Trotta, Mark Hayes, Sherry Blevins, Dan Forrest, Mack Wilberg, Christian Guebert, Patti Drennan, Giselle Wyers, Taylor Scott Davis, Paul A. Aitken, Erica Glenn, Reginal S. Wright, Santiago Veros, Khris Dodge, Loretta K. Notareschi, Lenora Helm Hammonds, Richard A. Nichols, and Shawn Crouch.

MidAmerica’s long-standing relationship with Sir John Rutter is among its most significant commissioning partnerships. On May 26, 1990, choirs from Arkansas, Connecticut, Minnesota, and Texas joined Rutter at Carnegie Hall for the world premiere of his Magnificat, commissioned by MidAmerica Productions. Rutter later returned to Carnegie Hall with MidAmerica for the 2003 world premiere of Mass of the Children, commissioned at the invitation of Peter Tiboris, with Rutter conducting.

Other MidAmerica commissions and premieres of Rutter’s music have included Cantate Domino, Distant Land, Celebration, Taranto: A Cathedral Triptych, Visions, I’ll Make Me a World, Magnificat, and Mass of the Children. The company presented the New York premiere of Canticles of Creation in 2015, the Carnegie Hall premiere of Visions in 2018, the New York premiere of Taranto: A Cathedral Triptych in 2023, the world premiere of Celebration in 2024, and the Carnegie Hall premiere of I'll Make Me A World in 2025.

MidAmerica has also presented premieres of works by composers from the United States and abroad. World premieres have included Dinos Constantinides’ Byron’s Greece, Hymn to the Human Spirit, and Midnight Fantasy II for Wind Ensemble; John Rutter’s Cantate Domino, Distant Land, and Magnificat; and John Leavitt’s A Christmas Garland. U.S. premieres have included Mozart’s Die Schuldigkeit des ersten Gebots, Reimann’s Concerto for Violin and Cello, Taneyev’s Upon Reading a Psalm, Tchaikovsky’s Ode to Joy, Mikis Theodorakis’ Electra and Rhapsody for Cello and Orchestra, and Clausen’s Hellas: In the Name of Freedom.

The company's programming has also included United States and New York premieres of works from different periods of the classical repertoire.

== Leadership ==
Peter Tiboris served as the company's founder and general music director from its establishment until his death on September 17, 2024.

Following Tiboris's death, MidAmerica Productions announced initiatives intended to support emerging music professionals and ensembles. These include a music-business apprenticeship, a scholarship for participating ensembles, and a conducting fellowship developed in connection with the University of Illinois, Tiboris's alma mater.
