= Remote Anti-Armor Mine System =

155mm howitzer projectiles containing anti-tank mines

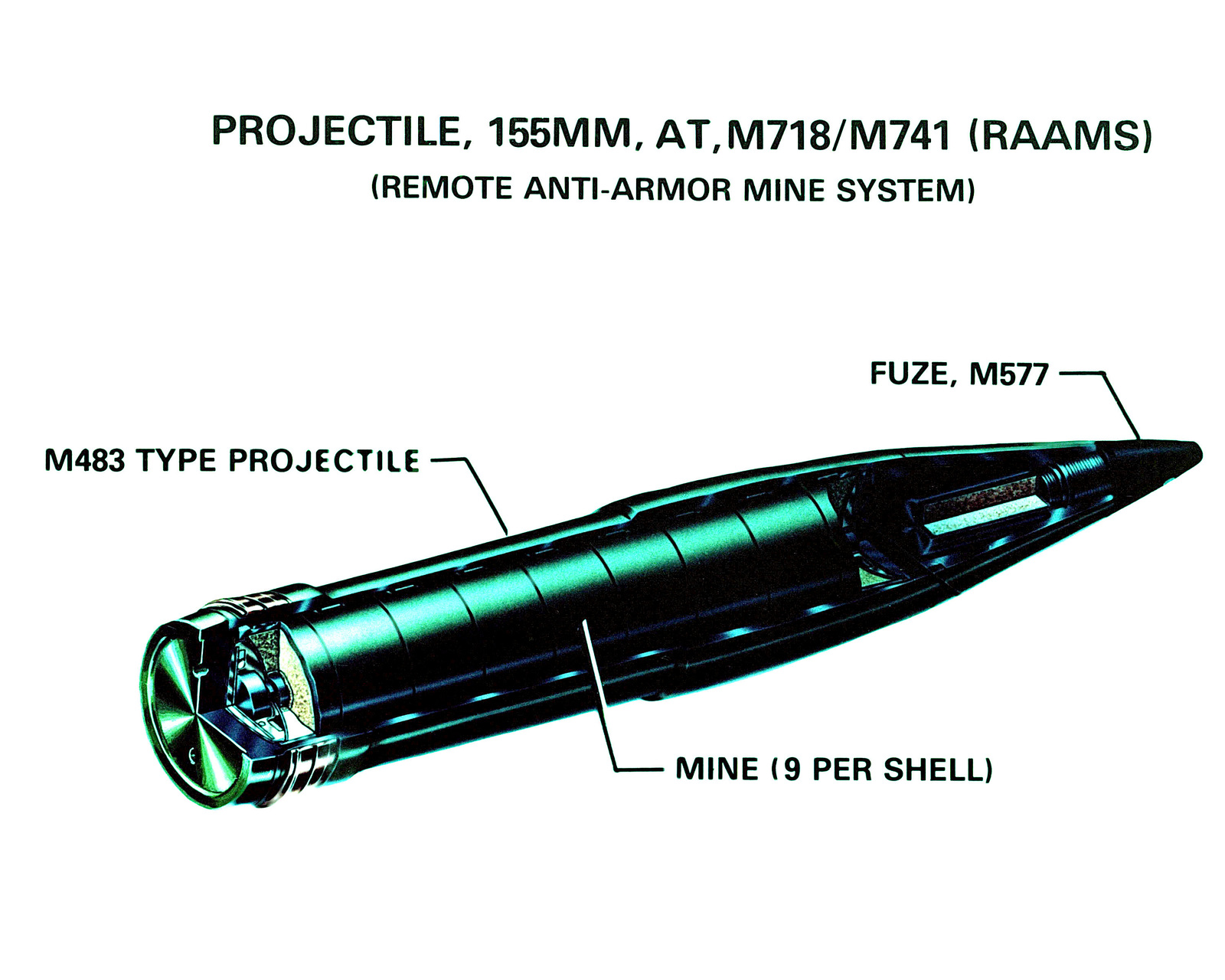
- RAAMS cutaway
- Type: Artillery shell with anti-tank mines
- Place of origin: United States

Service history
- Wars: Russo-Ukrainian War

Production history
- Designed: Around 1980

Specifications
- Mass: 5 lb (2.3 kg) (mine)
- Caliber: 155 mm (6.1 in)
- Maximum firing range: 17.6 km (10.9 mi)
- Filling: PBX 0280 (95% RDX, 5% Estane)
- Filling weight: 1.26 lb (0.57 kg)

The Remote Anti-Armor Mine System (RAAMS) are two types of 155 mm howitzer projectiles containing nine anti-tank mines each. They were developed for the United States Army around 1980.

Each round contains either the M718 or M718A1 (RAAM-L) mines, which have a self-destruct time over 48 hours; or the M741 or M741A1 (RAAM-S) mines, with a self-destruct time of approximately 4 hours. Both projectiles are used with the M577 or M577A1 Mechanical Time and Superquick (MTSQ) fuze, which triggers the ejection mechanism of the mines above enemy territory after a preset time.

These mines can be delivered at ranges from 4 to 17.6 kilometres (2.5 to 10.9 mi) from the artillery battery position using the M109, M198, or M777 howitzers.

The United States sent about 10,200 RAAMS rounds to Ukraine between the start of the Russian invasion of Ukraine in February 2022 and January 2023.

== See also ==
- Area denial artillery munition (ADAM), the anti-personnel equivalent of the RAAMS
- Family of Scatterable Mines (FASCAM)
