= Shielder minelaying system =

British anti-tank barrier delivery system

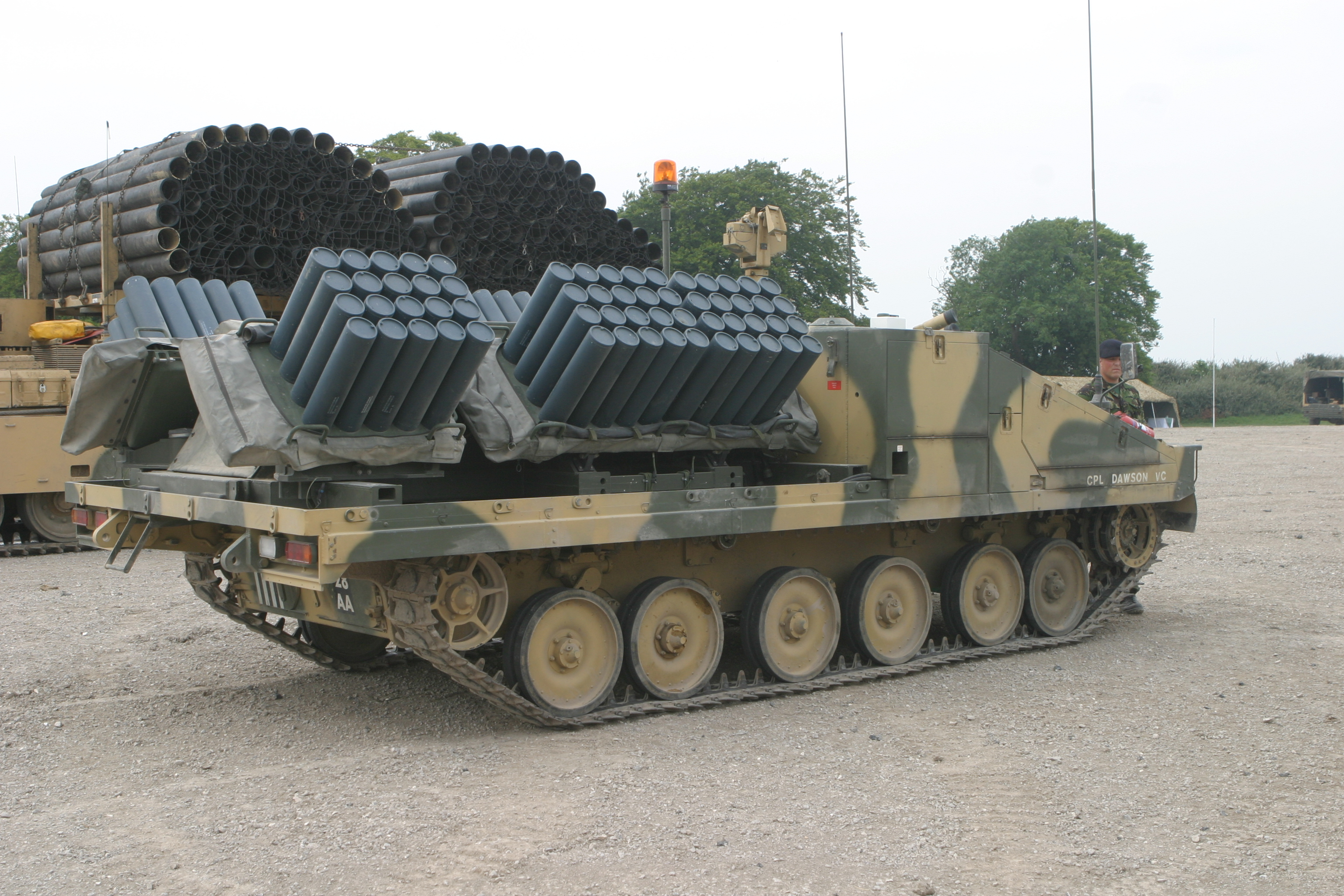
Shielder mounted on the Alvis Stormer AFV

The Shielder minelaying system was used by the British Army to create anti-tank barriers quickly. The system was based on the American Alliant Techsystems Volcano mine system. It was ordered in 1995 and first deployed in 1999. The system consists of up to 40 dispensers, each containing 6 mines, mounted on the flat bed version of the Alvis Stormer tracked armoured fighting vehicle. The dispensers can launch mines to the sides and rear of the vehicle as it proceeds. Each mine has a programmable life, after which they self-destruct. A dispenser control unit provides fire signals, testing and arming of the self-destruct mechanism.

Twenty-nine Shielder systems were in service with the British Army in 2009. In 2013/14 it was revealed that the system was removed from active service.

== Operators ==
- United Kingdom
- Ukraine
