= Flippin (surname) =

Flippin is a surname. Notable people with the surname include:

- C. Myron Flippin, American conductor and cellist
- Chris Flippin (21st century), American guitarist
- Lucy Lee Flippin, American actress
- Royce Flippin (1934–2021), American former college football player and athletics administrator
