= Flip =

Flip, FLIP, or flips may refer to:

== People ==
- Flip (nickname), a list of people
- Lil' Flip (born 1981), American rapper
- Flip Simmons, Australian actor and musician

== Arts and entertainment ==
=== Fictional characters ===
- Flip (Little Nemo), a cartoon character
- Flip, the title character of Flip's Twisted World, a video game
- Flip the Frog, a cartoon character
- Flip the grasshopper, a character in the children's book The Adventures of Maya the Bee

=== Music ===
- Flip Records (1950s), a rhythm and blues and doo-wop label based in Los Angeles
- Flip Records (1994), a record label in California
- Flips, a short name of The Flaming Lips, an American rock band formed in 1983
- Flip (album), a 1985 solo album by Nils Lofgren
- The Flip (album), a 1969 album by jazz saxophonist Hank Mobley
- "Flip", by Barenaked Ladies from Detour de Force
- "Flip", by Moka Only from The Station Agent

=== Books ===
- Flip (graphic novel), 2025 graphic novel by Ngozi Ukazu

== Business ==
- Flipping, an American term for buying and reselling something quickly, particularly real estate
- Flip Burger Boutique, a chain of gourmet hamburger restaurants in the southern United States
- Flip Skateboards, a skateboard and clothing company

== Events ==
- Festa Literária Internacional de Paraty, or FLIP, an annual literary festival in Paraty, Brazil
- Festival Ludique International de Parthenay, or FLIP, a games fair in Parthenay, France
- Flip Animation Festival, Wolverhampton (UK) based international animation festival

== Mathematics and statistics ==
- Flip (algebraic geometry), an operation in algebraic geometry
- Reflection (mathematics), sometimes called flip, an operation that preserves distances
- Flip graph, a graph of "flips" from one triangulation or other combinatorial structure to another
- Coin flip, a coin toss with a 50/50 chance of "heads" or "tails"

== Science and technology ==
- Flip (form), a hinged form factor for handheld electronic devices
- Fast Local Internet Protocol, or FLIP, a suite of internet protocols
- FLICE-like inhibitory protein (see CFLAR), protein involved in apoptosis
- Flip Video, a video camcorder
- Fluid-Implicit Particle, or FLIP, a simulation technique used in fluid animation
- Fluorescence loss in photobleaching, or FLIP, a microscopy technique
- RP FLIP ("Floating Instrument Platform"), an oceanic research vessel
- Functional Lumen Imaging Probe (FLIP) is a test used to evaluate the function of the esophagus
- Flip (software), a video discussion platform by Microsoft for use in classrooms
- DJI Flip, a Chinese camera drone
- FLIP rover, proposed moon rover developed by Astrolab

== Sports ==
- Flip (acrobatic), a leap followed by one or more revolutions while airborne
- Flip jump, a figure skating element
- "The Flip", a baseball play made in the 2001 American League Division Series by Derek Jeter

== Other uses ==
- Flip (cocktail)
- Franklin Large Igneous Province (FLIP), a large area of igneous rock in northern North America
- La Fundación para la Libertad de Prensa, or FLIP, a foundation for press freedom in Colombia
- Flip page, the visual effect of turning pages in digital publications
- Flip hairstyle, a hairstyle popular in the 1960s
- A derogatory term pertaining to Filipinos and Filipino-Americans
- An American colloquialism for turning state's evidence

== See also ==
- Flippin (disambiguation)
- Flop (disambiguation)
- Flipped (disambiguation)
- Flipper (disambiguation)
