= Area denial artillery munition =

US system for laying anti-personnel mines

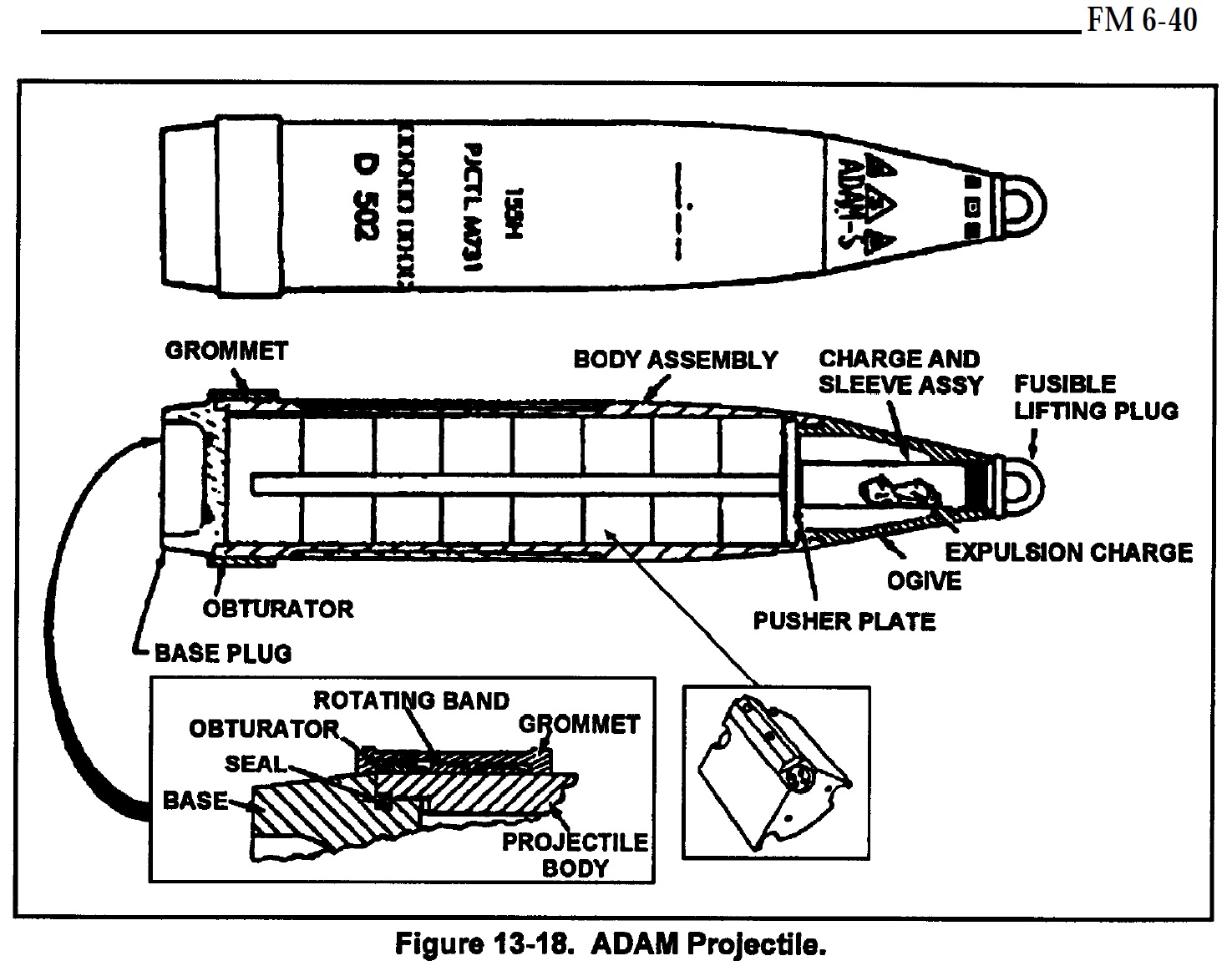
FM 6-40 depiction of the M731 155mm projectile, featuring bisected view and close up of an individual M72 land mine

Area denial artillery munition (ADAM) is a family of United States land mines and 155 mm artillery projectiles.

The mines carried by these projectiles are the M67 long-duration anti-personnel mines and M72 short-duration anti-personnel landmines intended to maim or kill enemy combatants. The duration refers to the self-destruct time, which is set at the time of manufacture to 4 or 48 hours.

Once the mine lands, it launches seven tripwires before arming itself. Any disturbance of the tripwires will trigger the mine. The mine is detonated only via electric current; if its battery charge drops below a pre-set level, the mine self-destructs. Even if it fails to self-destruct, the battery will fully discharge after 14 days, rendering the mine inactive.

The mines contain a spherical warhead in a cavity, along with 51 grams (1.8 oz) of M10 liquid propellant. The cavity allows the propellant fluid to settle under gravity in the correct position beneath the warhead, making it launch upward irrespective of the mine's orientation. Upon activation the spherical warhead is launched to a height of one to two metres (3.3 to 6.6 ft), where it detonates, producing approximately 600 fragments travelling at 900 metres per second (3,000 ft/s).

== Specifications ==
=== M67/M72 mine ===
- Self-destruct time:
  - M67: 48 hours
  - M72: 4 hours
- Height: 82.5 mm
- Width: 57 mm
- Weight: 540 g
- Explosive content: 21.9 g of composition A5 (RDX/wax)

=== M692/M731 155 mm projectile ===
- Weight (fuzed): 46.7 kg
- Calibre: 155 mm
- Length: 899 mm
- Contents:
  - M692: 36 M67 mines (long delay)
  - M731: 36 M72 mines (short delay)

== See also ==
- Family of Scatterable Mines (FASCAM)
- Remote Anti-Armor Mine System (RAAMS), the anti-armor equivalent of the ADAM
- M86 pursuit deterrent munition
- Ottawa Treaty
