= Flipped =

Flipped may refer to:

- Flipped (novel), a young adult novel by Wendelin Van Draanen
- Flipped (TV series), an American comedy series
- Flipped (2010 film), an American romantic comedy-drama film based on the novel
- Flipped (2015 film), a thriller film
- "Flipped" (Law & Order: Criminal Intent), an episode of Law & Order: Criminal Intent
- Flipped classroom, an instructional strategy
- Flipped image, an image generated by a mirror-reversal of an original across a horizontal axis

== See also ==
- Flip (disambiguation)
