= C. Myron Flippin =

C. Myron Flippin is an American conductor and cellist, best known for conducting the North Arkansas Symphony Youth Orchestra in a performance at Carnegie Hall on April 6, 2008, and as guest conductor for MidAmerica Productions on June 6, 2010, in a performance at Carnegie Hall in New York City of Mozart's Mass in C, the "Coronation" mass, K317. He currently resides in Northwest Arkansas where he is music director for the Ozarks Philharmonic Youth Orchestras, Inc. and conducts the Youth Symphony of the Ozarks. Flippin is also a professional bass vocalist specializing in the requiems, oratorios, and orchestra solos.

== Biography ==
C. Myron Flippin earned his Master of Music degree in cello performance and voice in 1990 and Doctoral of Musical Arts (ABD) in orchestral conducting in 1994. He studied, performed and conducted in Austria in 1989 and 1992. There, he performed with the Melkus Ensemble in concerts at Eggenberg Castle, and the International Symphony, as well as with Christopher Bunting and Phyllis Young in master classes and concerts.

In April 2008, C. Myron Flippin made his debut at Carnegie Hall with the now-defunct North Arkansas Symphony Youth Orchestra. Flippin returned to Carnegie Hall as guest conductor of the New England Chamber Ensemble in MidAmerica Productions presentation of Mozart's "Coronation Mass" in June, 2010.

In July, 2008, he was appointed the conductor of the Youth Symphony of the Ozarks for its inaugural season.
