= GATOR mine system =

American system of air-dropped anti-tank and anti-personnel mines

CBU-89/B
Primary function:	450 kg (1,000 lb) unpowered cluster munition weapon
Length:	2.34 m (7 ft 8 in)
Diameter:	410 mm (16 in)
Range:	Freefall
CBU-78/B
Primary function:	230 kg (500 lb) unpowered cluster munition weapon
Length:	2.34 m (7 ft 8 in)
Diameter:	410 mm (16 in)
Weight:	222 kg
Range:	Freefall

The GATOR mine system is a United States military system of air-dropped anti-tank and anti-personnel mines developed in the 1980s to be compatible with existing cluster dispensers. It is used with two dispenser systems: the Navy 230 kg (500 lb) CBU-78/B and the Air Force 450 kg (1,000 lb) CBU-89/B. Additionally the mines are used with the land- and helicopter-based Volcano mine system.

== Operation ==
In use the bombs are dropped from aircraft flying at speeds between 370 and 1,300 km/h (200 and 700 kn), and at altitudes of between 100 and 1,200 meters. An FMU-140/B fuze controls the opening of the dispenser at one of 10 predetermined altitudes between 90 m and 900 m using a Doppler ranging radar or alternatively a 1.2 second time fuse. Mine arming begins when the dispenser opens with the activation of the mines' vanadium pentoxide batteries. The circular mines have a rectangular plastic "aeroballistic" adaptor. Once the mines reach the ground they become armed between 1.2 and 10 seconds.

The mines self-destruct after a preset time which can be set to 4 hours, 15 hours or 15 days. Any that do not will become disabled after 40 days when the batteries discharge fully. The self-destruct time is set just prior to aircraft takeoff using a simple selector switch on the dispenser. During the Gulf War the dud rate for this system was significant; in one of seven Kuwaiti battlefield sectors there were 205 BLU-91 and 841 BLU-92 duds. Given that 89,235 BLU-91 and 27,535 BLU-92 mines were used during the Gulf War, this represents a dud rate of somewhere between 0.5 and 2% for the BLU-91 and to 6 to 21% for the BLU-92. Additionally, Conventional Munition Systems Inc. minefield clearing personnel reported dud GATOR mines detonating with no apparent triggering event, and speculated that the extreme heat of the Kuwait desert may have triggered detonation.

The GATOR system provides a means to emplace minefields on the ground rapidly using high-speed tactical aircraft. A typical GATOR minefield is 650 m long and 200 m wide and contains 432 anti-tank mines and 132 anti-personnel mines. The minefields are used for area denial, diversion of moving ground forces, or to immobilize targets to supplement other direct attack weapons. In the 1991 Gulf War the US Air Force employed 1,105 CBU-89s. One reported task was to hamper the movements of Iraqi Scud missile launchers.

In the context of the 2026 Iran war journalists from Bellingcat concluded that BLU-91/B anti-tank mines had probably been deployed from a GATOR mine system over the village of Kafari in Fars Province. A possible motivation for this is the village's location close to Shiraz South Missile Base. The mines could destroy or disable the ballistic missile launchers and deny the roads around the bases to launcher vehicles.

== Air Force CBU-89/B ==
The Air Force CBU-89/B is a 450-kilogram (1,000 lb) cluster munition containing 72 antitank and 22 antipersonnel mines, consists of an SUU-64 Tactical Munitions Dispenser with an optional FZU-39 proximity sensor. The TMD is the same general configuration used for the CBU-87/B Combined Effects Munition. This commonality allows for high-rate, low-cost production of the dispenser.

When the CBU-89 is used in conjunction with the Wind Corrected Munitions Dispenser guidance tail kit, it became a precision-guided munition designated as CBU-104.

== Navy CBU-78/B ==
The Navy CBU-78/B is a 230-kilogram (500 lb) cluster munition containing 45 antitank and 15 antipersonnel mines. It uses the same dispenser as the Mk7 Rockeye.

== Mines ==
=== BLU-91/B anti-tank mine ===
The BLU-91 /B AT mine is a low flat cylinder with a rectangular aeroballistic shell. A magnetic sensor in the mine detects potential targets. When a suitable target reaches the most vulnerable approach point it detonates the mine. The mine is also triggered if the mine is moved, or if the battery reaches a certain low voltage point.

Once the fuse is triggered, a small clearing charge is fired that clears any debris that may be on top of the mine. A second larger charge is triggered 30 ms later, creating an Explosively Formed Penetrator capable of penetrating 70 mm of armour, using the Misznay-Schardin effect. The charge is capable of penetrating most armoured vehicles from below.

The mine weighs 1.95 kilograms and is 127 millimeters in diameter, with 580 grams of an RDX/Estane explosive mix.

=== BLU-92/B anti-personnel mine ===
After the mine reaches the ground, and the arming delay has passed, a squib is fired launching eight tripwires from the mine. Tension on any of the wires triggers the mine electronically; it also has an anti-handling "ball and can" switch. The mine has an effective fragmentation radius of about 20 meters.

The mine is approximately 127 millimeters in diameter and weighs 1.68 kilograms. The mine's main charge consists of 420 grams of Composition B-4.

== See also ==
- Family of Scatterable Mines (FASCAM)
