= Volcano mine system =

Mine delivery system developed by the United States Army

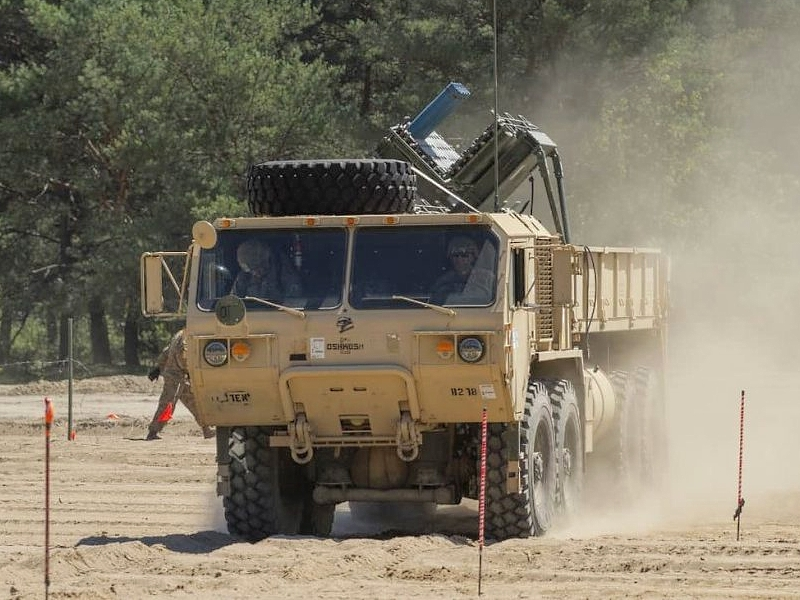
M977 HEMTT with M136 Volcano mine dispensing system

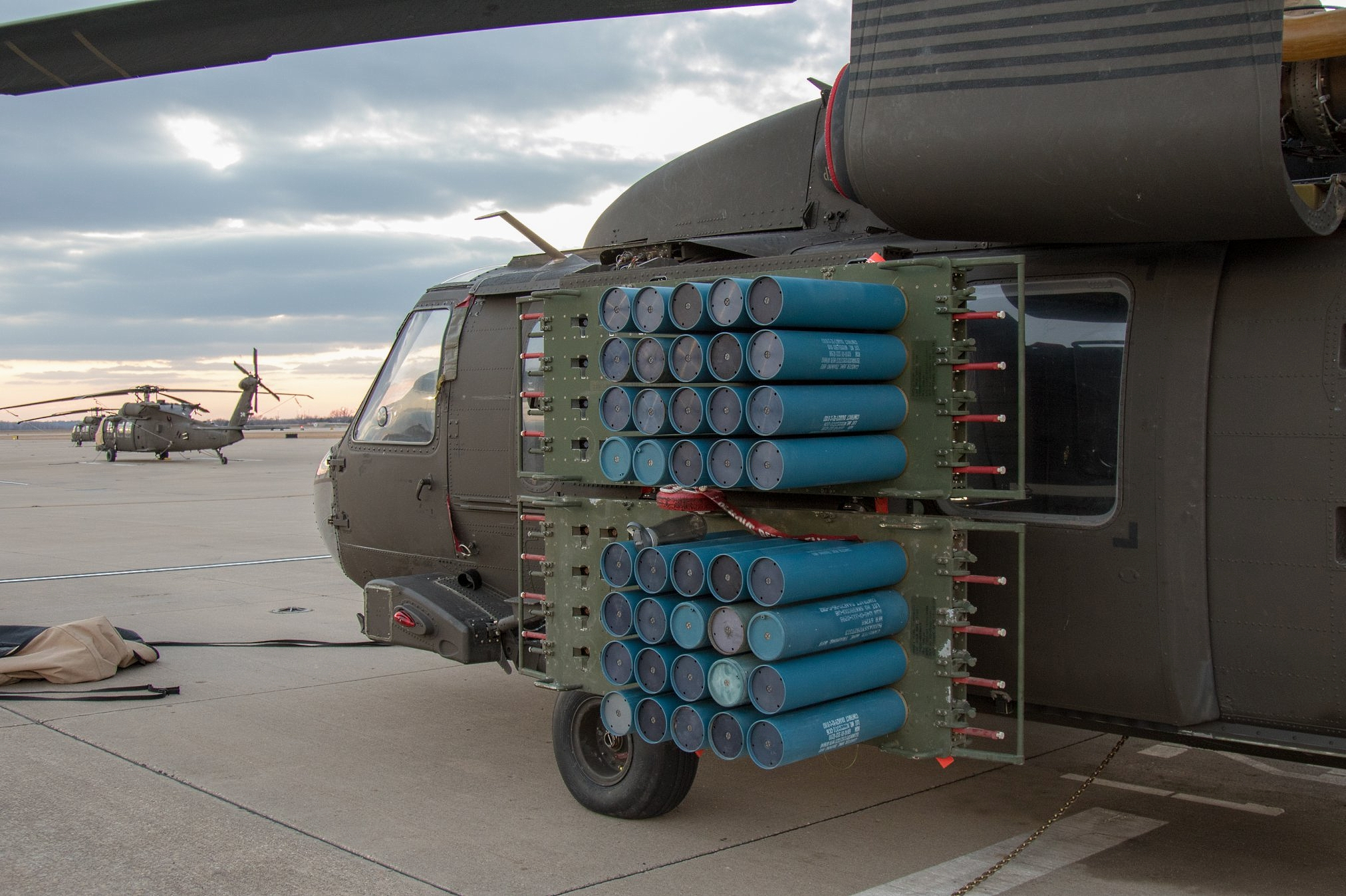
UH-60 Blackhawk with M136 Volcano mine dispensing system

The M136 Volcano Vehicle-Launched Scatterable Mine System is an automated mine delivery system developed by the United States Army in the 1980s. The system uses prepackaged mine canisters which contain multiple anti-personnel (AP) and/or anti-tank (AT) mines which are dispersed over a wide area when ejected from the canister. The system, commonly referred to as Volcano, is also used by other armies around the world.

== Overview ==
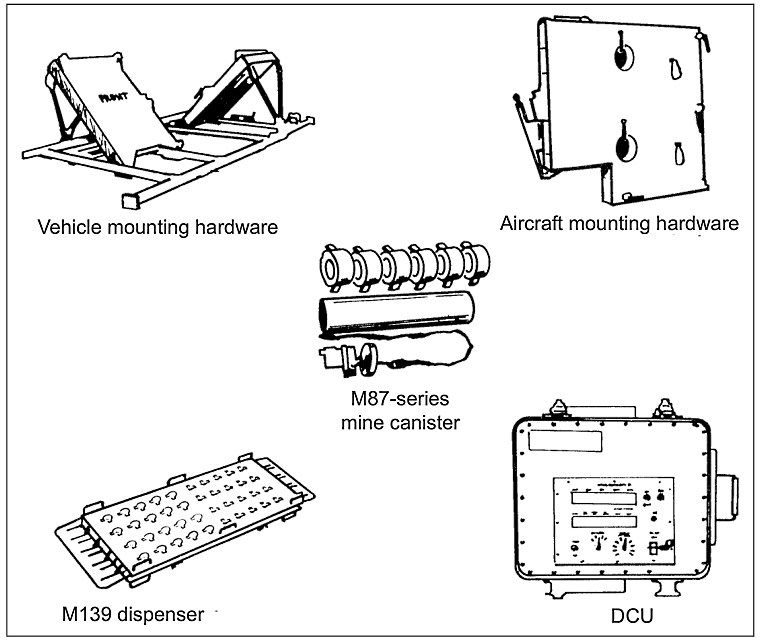
Volcano mine system components

The primary purpose of Volcano is to provide the employing force with the capability to emplace large minefields rapidly under varied conditions. Volcano minefields are ideal for providing flank protection of advancing forces and for operating in concert with air and ground units on flank guard or screen missions.

The system consists of the M139 dispenser used for dispensing pre-packaged mine canisters, the dispensing control unit (DCU) and mounting hardware, and is designed to be mounted on either ground or aerial vehicles using the same components except for the mounting hardware, which varies between fitment. Volcano is designed to be fitted to and removed from vehicles with a minimum of time and labour. The dispensing system is also designed for ease of use, to be operated by personnel with a minimum of training. The ordnance used by the system is based upon a modified GATOR mine. Both live and inert (training) ordnance is available; live canisters are painted green while inert canisters are painted blue.

When fitted to aircraft, the system is referred to as Air Volcano and when fitted to ground vehicles is referred to as Ground Volcano. The principles and procedures of Volcano minefield emplacement are significantly different for air- and ground-delivery systems; the differences can be summarised as follows:

=== Air Volcano ===
Air Volcano is the fastest method for emplacing large tactical minefields. Although mine placement is not as precise as it is with ground systems, Air Volcano minefields can be placed accurately enough to avoid the danger inherent in minefields delivered by artillery or jet aircraft. Air Volcano is the best form of an obstacle reserve because a minefield can be emplaced in minutes.

Air Volcano minefield should not be planned or dispensed in areas under enemy observation and fire as the dispensing helicopter is extremely vulnerable to anti-aircraft fire while flying at a steady altitude, speed and flight path required to successfully emplace the minefield. Close coordination between aviation and ground units is required to ensure that Volcano-dispensed mines are emplaced accurately and quickly.

=== Ground Volcano ===
Ground Volcano is designed to emplace large minefields in depth and tactical minefields oriented on enemy forces in support of manoeuvre operations and friendly AT fire. It is ideal for use as an obstacle reserve, employed when enemy forces reach a decision point that indicates future movement. Obstacles can then be emplaced in depth on the avenues the enemy is using, leaving other avenues open for friendly movement.

Ground Volcano is normally employed by combat engineer units. Emplaced minefields are vulnerable to direct and indirect fire, and must be protected when close to the forward line of own troops (FLOT).

== Design ==
=== Ordnance ===
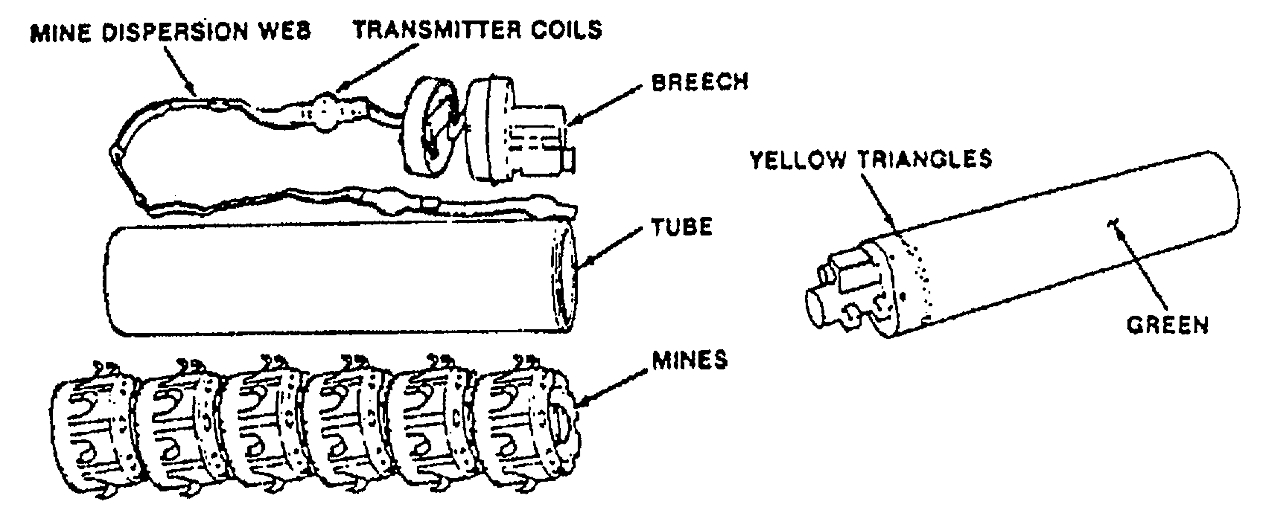
M87 mine canister

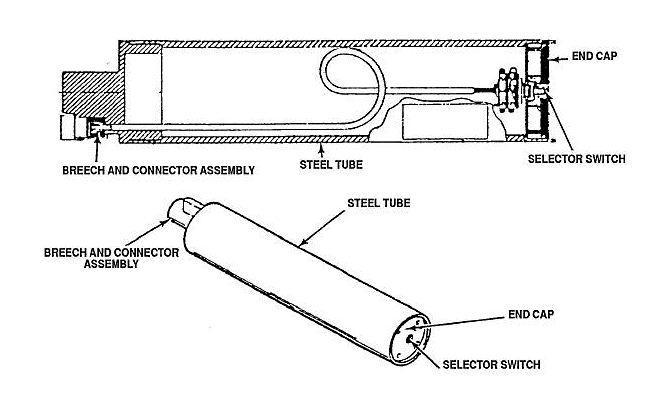
M89 training canister

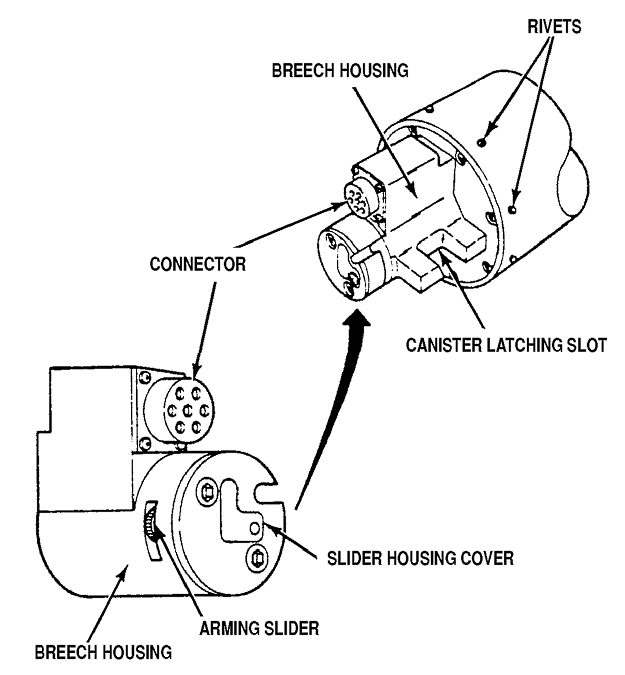
M87 canister breech assembly

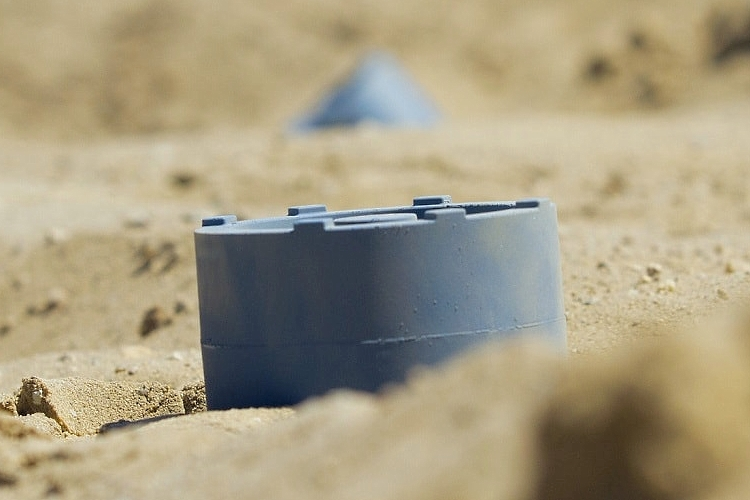
M88 training mine

The Volcano system uses the following live ordnance:

- M87 Mine Canister: The M87 mine canister is prepackaged with five AT mines and one AP mine, each mine measuring 12 cm (4.72 in) in diameter and 6 cm (2.36 in) in height. The mixture of mines is fixed and cannot be altered in the field. Each AP mine contains approximately 412 grams (14.5 ounces) of explosives, mostly Comp B-4, and each AT mine contains approximately 605 grams (21.3 ounces) of explosives, mostly RDX. AP mines have an electrical fusing circuit triggered by a trip wire; each mine deploys eight trip wires (four on the top and four on the bottom) after ground impact up to 12 metres (39 feet) from the mine. AT mines have a magnetically induced fuse and do not have anti-disturbance devices; however, they are highly sensitive to movement once they are armed and any attempt to remove the mines will likely result in detonation.

The canister is an aluminium tube 24.09 inches (61 centimetres) in length and 5 inches (13 centimetres) in diameter and weighs 30.2 pounds (13.7 kilograms). There is a breech assembly at one end attached to which are six transmitter coils, one for each mine, which physically and electronically connects to the dispenser. Canisters (live) are painted green (FS34079) with a band of yellow and black triangles near the breech end. The mines in each canister are electrically connected by a nylon web that also functions as a lateral dispersion device as the mines exit the canister. Spring fingers mounted on each mine prevent the mine from coming to rest on edge. Upon coming to rest, each mine has a delayed arming time of 2 minutes and 15 seconds. (Note: Arming time is as per field manual FM 20-32; field manual FM 1-113 specifies arming times of 2 minutes and 15 seconds for the AT mine and 4 minutes for the AP mine.) Each mine canister has a variable self destruct with three settings of 4 hours, 48 hours or 15 days, preset prior to dispensing.

- M87A1 Mine Canister: Identical to the M87 except each the canister contains six AT mines.

The Volcano system also allows the use of the following inert ordnance:

- M88 Practice Mine Canister: the M88 has the same physical specifications as the M87, but contains six inert training mines with the same physical dimensions as those contained with the M87. As the practice canister has the same amount of propellant as the M87, it produces mine dispersal patterns the same as those of the live ordnance so as to allow practice of laying minefields. The M88 is painted blue with a brown band near the end cap which has a brown ring with a large blue dot in the centre.
- M89 Training Canister: the M89 is designed for training and fault diagnosis, and is painted blue with no colour bands. It has the same physical specifications as the M87 but is completely inert and does not contain any mines, and can be used in training of loading and unloading operations as well as practice flights for dispensing aircraft in laying minefields. To make up for the lack of mines, the canister has heavy steel wall construction and weighs the same as the M87 canister so that the dispensing aircraft's flight characteristics are the same as if carrying live ordnance. The M89 can also be used for system fault diagnosis and training; the end cap (i.e. the opposite end to the breech assembly) has a rotary selector switch (set with a flat-blade screwdriver) with four positions that:
1. simulates a functional canister
2. simulates an error code 4, shorted electric primer
3. simulates an error code 8, rack electronics failure
4. simulates an error code 9, open electric primer.

=== Dispenser and Control Unit ===
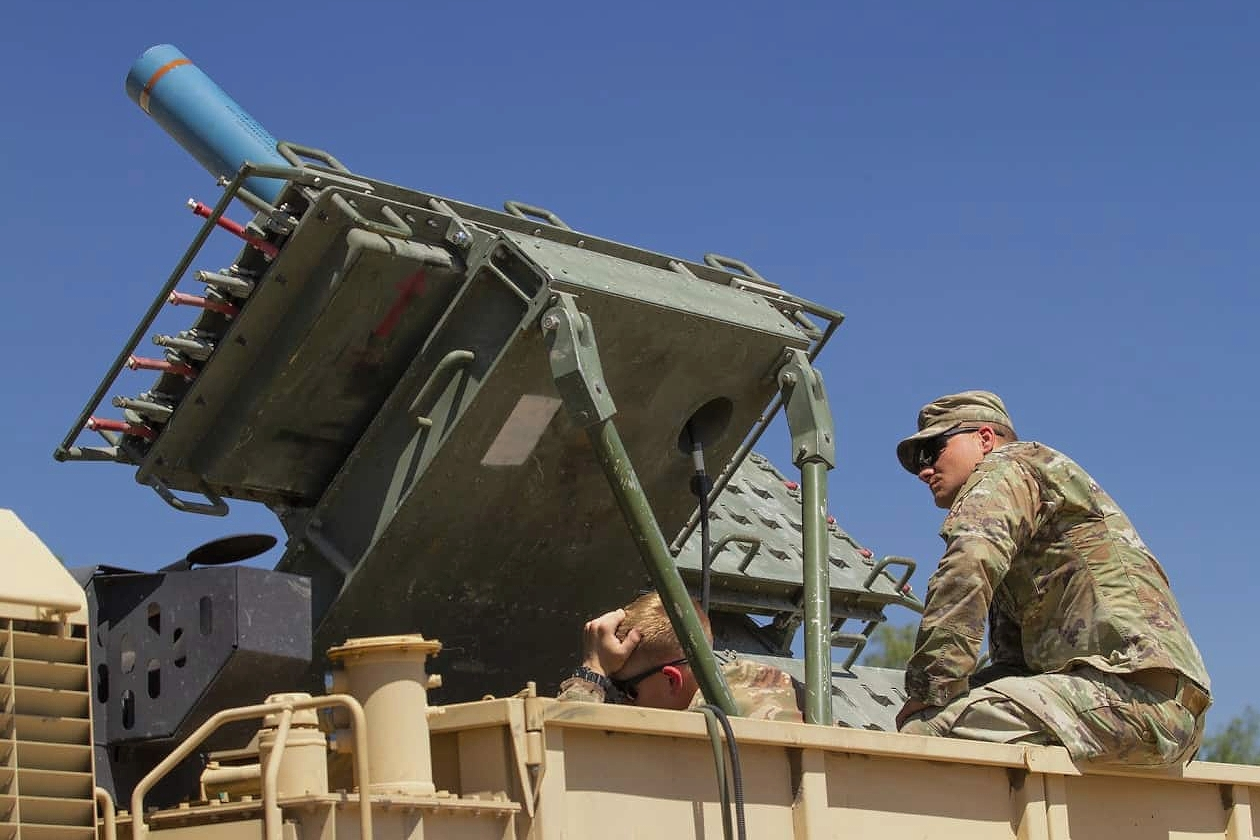
M139 Volcano mine dispenser fitted with M88 practice mine canister

- M139 Dispenser: The dispenser consists of four launching racks that are mounted to the dispensing vehicle or aircraft. Each rack can hold up to 40 M87 mine canisters. Each canister contains six mines, so the total capacity for the dispenser is 960 mines. Mine canisters are physically and electrically connected to the mounting racks. The racks provide the structural strength and the mechanical support required for launch and provide the electrical interface between the mine canisters and the DCU. The load/reload time for an experienced four-man crew is approximately 20 minutes.
- Dispensing Control Unit (DCU): The DCU is the central control panel for the Volcano mine dispensing system, providing controls for the arming sequence and the delivery speed selection, initiate the arming sequence and set the self-destruct time for the mines. The DCU allows the operator to start and stop mine dispensing at anytime, and counter indicates the number of canisters remaining on each rack. The operator also uses the DCU to perform fault isolation tests on the system. For aircraft-mounted installations i.e. Air Volcano, the start-stop firing switch is located on the pilot and co-pilot's joysticks or cyclic sticks, allowing either pilot to initiate or stop the dispensing of mines., and the DCU has an additional switch for selecting the aircraft's dispensing speed.

=== Mounting Hardware ===
The mounting hardware secures the racks to the dispensing vehicle or aircraft, and are specific to each type of dispensing vehicle or aircraft. For aircraft, the racks are equipped with a jettison assembly to release and propel the racks away from the aircraft in case of an emergency. Available mounting racks, listed by vehicle and NATO stock number (NSN), includes:

- Ground Volcano, M548A1 Carrier (NSN 1095-01-331-6755)
- Ground Volcano, M939 5-Ton Truck (NSN 1095-01-252-2818)
- Ground Volcano, M1075/1075Palletized Load System (PLS) (NSN 1095-01-492-4259)
- Air Volcano, UH-60A/L Helicopter (NSN 1095-01-253-2030)

== Operation ==
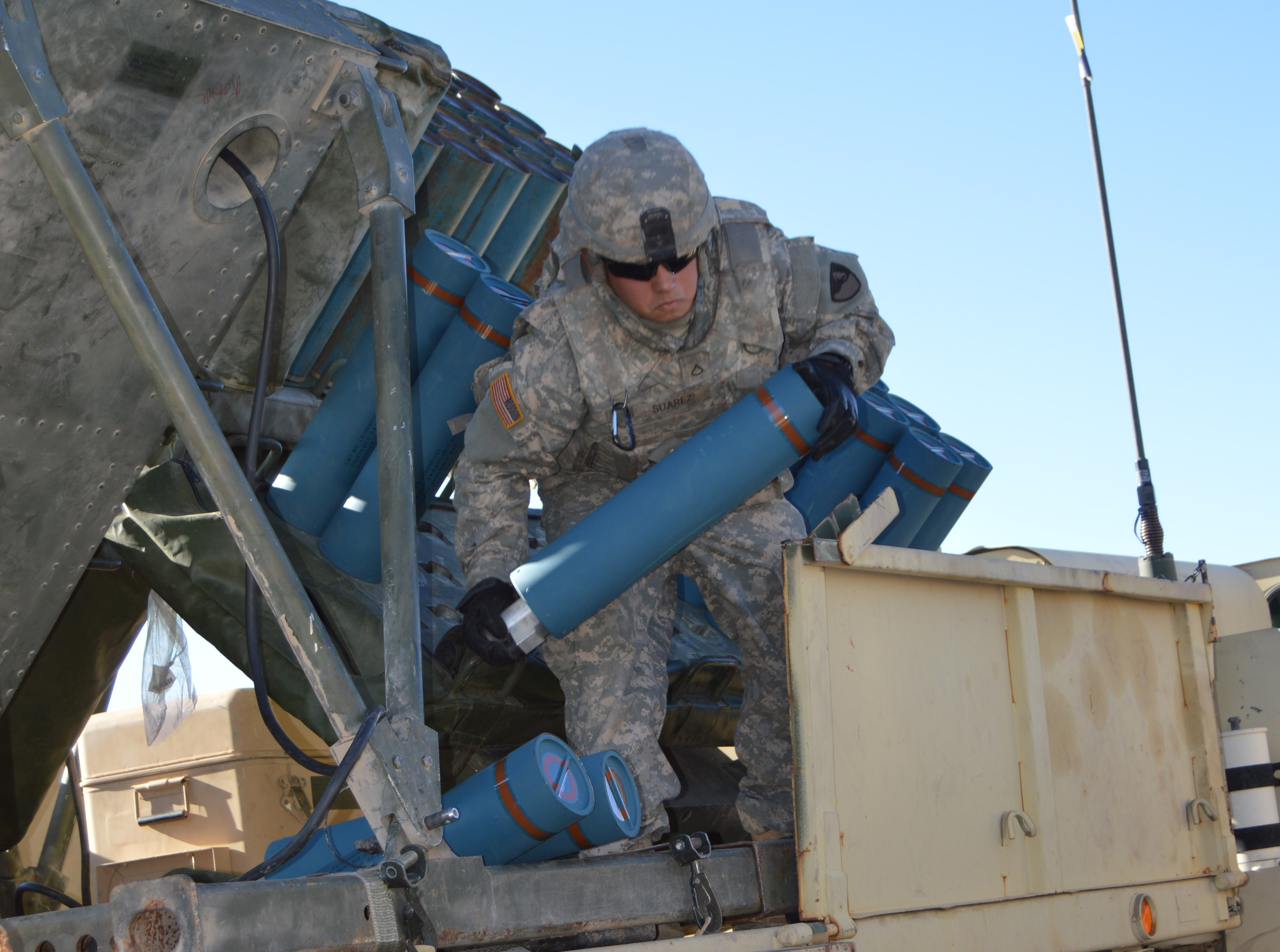
US soldier reloading Volcano mine system

=== Handling ===
Volcano munitions are transported and handled in accordance with regulations for Class V mines and explosives.

=== Training and Personnel ===
Volcano operation requires no special skills as the system is designed for ease of use such that only a designated rather than a dedicated operator is required. Initial operator training will be for familiarisation only with a semi-annual refresher course expected to be sufficient to maintain proficiency. In training operations, the M87 mine canister is replaced with the M88 Practice Mine Canister or M89 Training Canister.

=== Types of Minefields ===
The Volcano system is suitable for emplacing four different types of minefields, each of which has a specific purpose:

1. Disrupt: Causes confusion in enemy formations. For this minefield, the lethality and density is low.
2. Fix: Allows massed ground fire upon the enemy. Placement is critical; the commander must plan this type of minefield carefully and the location must be synchronised to allow the ground forces to mass their fires on the enemy once the enemy has been fixed by the obstacle i.e. encounters the minefield.
3. Turn: Influences the manoeuvre of enemy formations. For this minefield, density and lethality are critical. Individual minefields may be stacked so as to influence the enemy movement.
4. Block: Deny the enemy use of terrain. This minefield requires high density and lethality, as well as reinforcement from other obstacles (natural and man-made), to help stop the enemy's use of the terrain.

Both Air and Ground Volcano are capable of emplacing non-standard minefields i.e. one whose purpose (and therefore layout) does not adhere to the four types described above.

=== Mine Emplacement ===
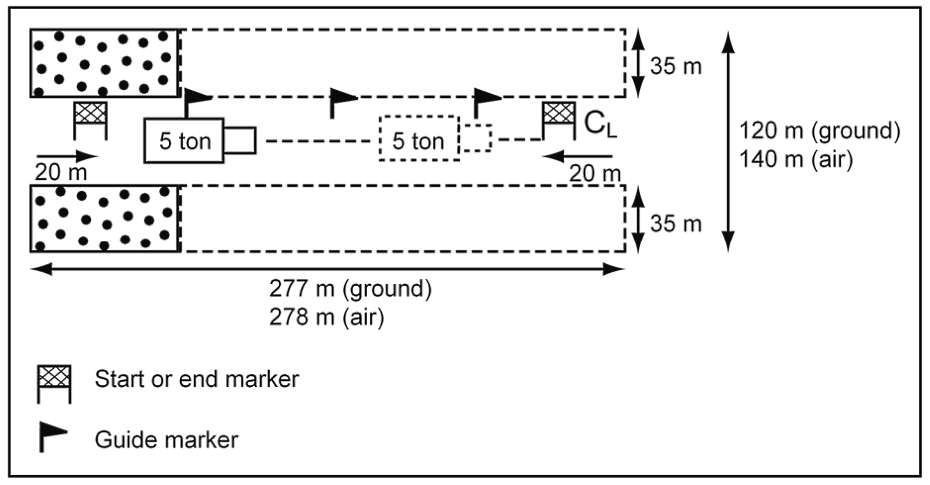
Volcano disrupt and fix minefield

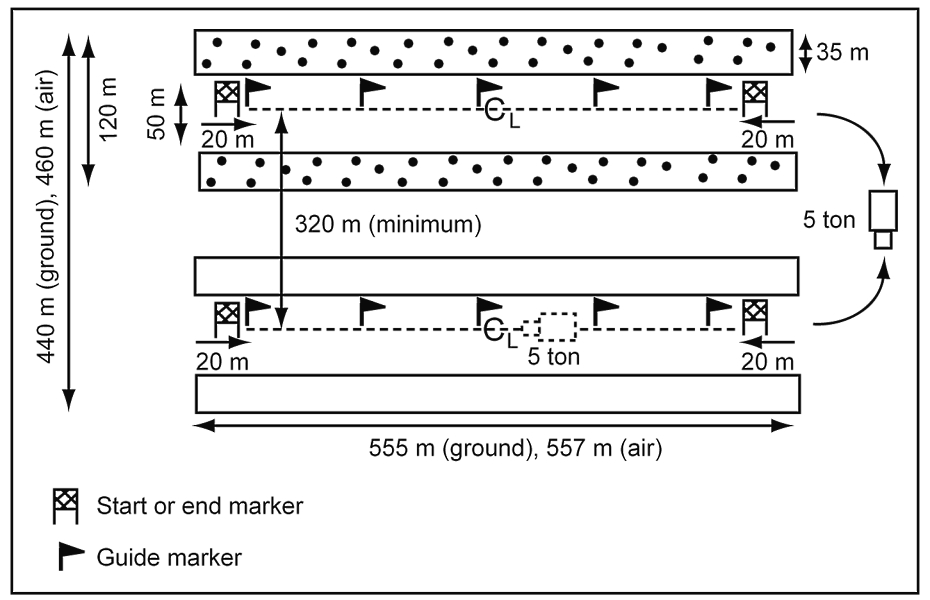
Volcano turn and block minefield

The Volcano system can emplace a minefield with an average density of 0.72 mines per meter for AT mines and 0.14 mines per meter for AP mines. The densities will vary slightly due to some mines failing to arm and self-destructing two to four minutes after dispensing. There may also be some mines that may not orient correctly when dispensed and not deliver their full blast effect. However, the probability of mines failing the arming sequence or not orienting correctly is relatively small and does not appreciably degrade the minefield lethality. For tracked vehicles entering a Volcano minefield, the AT density yields more than 80 percent probability of the vehicle encountering a mine.

The number of canisters and vehicles loads required to emplace a minefield depends upon the type of minefield required. Turn and block minefields are emplaced using the same basic procedures as those used for disrupt and fix minefields; however, turn and block minefields use two strips of mines, each strip with twice as many mines. The following table lists the number of mines required for each type of minefield of a given size:

| Type of minefield | Depth (meters) | Front (meters) | Number of strips | Canisters per strip | Total canisters | Vehicle loads |
|---|---|---|---|---|---|---|
| Disrupt | 140 | 278 | 1 | 40 (20 per side) | 40 | 0.25 |
| Fix | 140 | 278 | 1 | 40 (20 per side) | 40 | 0.25 |
| Turn | 340 | 557 | 2 | 80 (40 per side) | 160 | 1 |
| Block | 340 | 557 | 2 | 80 (40 per side) | 160 | 1 |

==== From Aircraft (Air Volcano) ====
When fitted to an aircraft, mines are dispensed 35 to 70 metres (115 to 230 feet) from the aircraft's flight path. The aircraft flies at a minimum altitude of 5 feet (1.5 metres) at speeds ranging from 20 to 120 knots (37 to 222 kilometres per hour). One aircraft can dispense up to 960 mines per sortie.

The Air Volcano DCU has a switch to select the aircraft's dispensing speed, with six airspeed settings - 20, 30, 40, 55, 80, and 120 knots. The recommended airspeed for dispersal is 40 knots; higher airspeeds should only be used if absolutely necessary. The time to dispense a load of Volcano munitions depends upon the airspeed as follows:

| Knots | Disrupt and Fix minefields | Turn and Block minefields | Dispense 160 canisters |
|---|---|---|---|
| 20 | 27 seconds | 54 seconds | 108 seconds |
| 30 | 18 seconds | 36 seconds | 72 seconds |
| 40 | 13 seconds | 27 seconds | 54 seconds |
| 55 | 9 seconds | 18 seconds | 39 seconds |
| 80 | 6 seconds | 13 seconds | 27 seconds |
| 120 | 4 seconds | 9 seconds | 18 seconds |
| Minefield width (meters) | 278 | 557 | 1,115 |
| No. passes per minefield | 1 | 2 | 1 |
| No. canisters per pass | 40 | 80 | 160 |

When emplacing an Air Volcano minefield from a UH-60 Blackhawk helicopter, the door gunner is unable to operate the aircraft's machine gun. Therefore, if the minefield is being emplaced in an area with suspected or reported enemy activity, it is recommended that the Blackhawk is accompanied by an AH-64 Apache to provide suppressing fire if needed.

==== From Ground Vehicles (Ground Volcano) ====
For ground vehicles, mines are dispensed 25 to 60 metres (82 to 197 feet) from the vehicle at ground speeds of 5 to 55 mph (8 to 89 km/h). A constant speed is maintained while the mines are being dispensed so as to attain a consistent mine density. The average time to emplace one load (160 canisters) is 10 minutes. After each load has been dispensed, the vehicle moves out of the minefield and marks the exit. Vehicle must then wait a minimum of 4 minutes before approaching or re-entering the minefield to allow faulty mines to self-destruct.

=== Minefield Marking ===
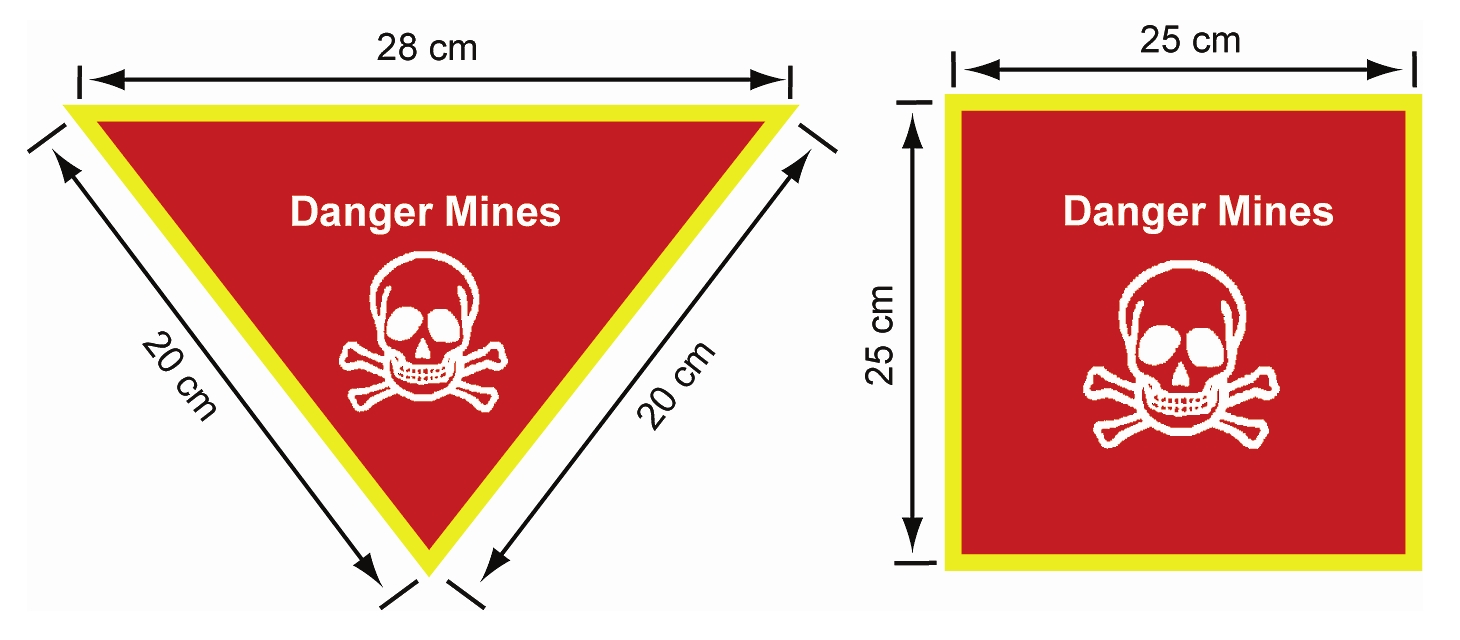
US Army landmine warning signs

Once laid, minefields are marked to reduce the possibility of friendly forces triggering the mines, and in areas with civilian populations, to avoid collateral casualties. Operational doctrine specifies that:

- in enemy forward areas minefields are not marked.
- in friendly forward areas, minefields are marked on the sides facing friendly forces only.
- in the rear areas (considered friendly) minefields are marked on all 4 sides.
- in forward areas where minefields cannot be formally marked, improvised hazard markers such as rocks or branches should be used if their location or pattern of placement could warn the enemy of the existence of the minefield.
- where a previously unmarked minefield located in enemy territory comes under the control of friendly forces action must be taken to appropriately mark the minefield as soon as practically possible.

Marking is by way of hazard signs attached to signposts and where appropriate, surrounded by boundary fences constructed from standard fencing materials such as barbed wire, concertina wire, and pierced steel planking. Fence sections should be attached to steel or concrete fence posts set sufficiently into the ground to discourage locals from removing them for their own use. Hazard marking begins no less than 20 meters from the outer perimeter of the minefield with warning signs placed at regular intervals outside of the fenced area.

Hazard signs are to be only those approved for U.S. Army use which follow international mine-marking conventions. There are two basic designs for the shape of a hazards sign—square or triangular, each marked with the standardized symbol of a skull and crossbones along with a printed warning of the hazard (i.e., "DANGER MINES"). When such signs are unavailable, the approved alternative is to use warning signs specifically denoting booby traps or unexploded ordnance (UXO).

== Dispenser Vehicles ==
The following ground vehicles and aircraft can be used to dispense the Volcano mines:

- M548 Tracked Cargo Carrier
- M939 series 5-ton 6x6 truck
- M977 Heavy Expanded Mobility Tactical Truck (HEMTT)
- M1074/1075 Palletized Load System (PLS) prime mover
- UH-60 Blackhawk helicopter

== Operators ==
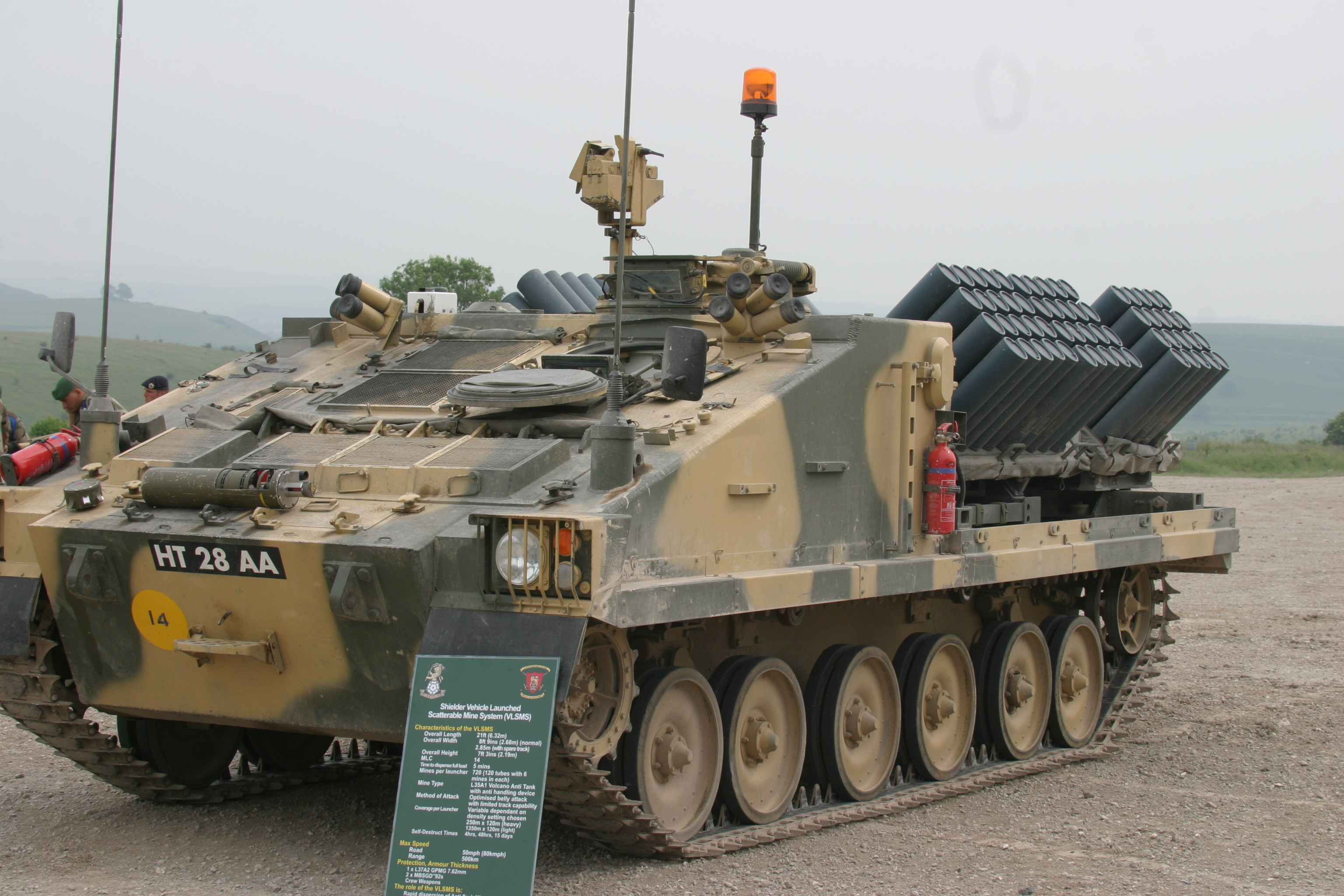
British Army Alvis Stormer fitted with Shielder (Volcano)

=== Current Operators ===
- South Korea: the Republic of Korea Army uses the Volcano system with M548 dispensing vehicles.
- United States: the U.S. Army decommissioned the system from active units during the late-1990s and placed the components into storage, but began reusing the system in 2017.
- Taiwan: in 2022 the U.S. State Department approved the sale of the system to Taiwan. It was later stated that the first 7 systems will be delivered to Taiwan by the end of 2023, with the rest by the end of 2026.

=== Potential Operators ===
- Poland: in 2019 and 2020 the U.S. Army demonstrated the system to the Polish Army.

=== Former Operators ===
- United Kingdom: from 1999 the British Army used the Volcano in its Shielder minelaying system, fitted to modified Alvis Stormer AFVs. These vehicles were withdrawn from service in 2013/14.

== See also ==
- Family of Scatterable Mines (FASCAM)
- Ottawa Treaty
