= Flop =

Flop or variations may refer to:

== Arts, entertainment and media ==
- Box-office flop or commercial flop, in the entertainment world

=== Film and television ===
- Flop (film), from Argentina
- Flop Show, an Indian TV sitcom
- The Flop House, a film podcast

=== Music ===
- Flop (band), a defunct 1990s era pop-punk group from Seattle, Washington, US
- Flop!, an industrial and synthpop album by the band And One
- Flop (album), by Maurizio Pisciottu

== Science and technology ==
- Flop (algebraic geometry), a birational transformation
- Flop-transition, in the string theory of physics
- FLOPS (floating point operations per second), in computing
- Flopped image, a type of mirror image in photography, graphic design, and printing
- Wheel flop, a consequence of some bicycle and motorcycle geometries

== Sports ==
- Flop (basketball), an intentional fall to claim a foul
- Diving (association football), intentional fall sometimes called flop in the US
- Diving (ice hockey)
- Flop shot, in golf
- Fosbury flop, in high jump

== Other uses ==
- Flop (poker), a poker term describing the first three cards dealt to the board
- Flophouse or flop house, a cheap transients' rooming house

== See also ==
- Flip (disambiguation)
- Flip-flop (disambiguation)
