= Dinos Constantinides =

Greek-American composer and music educator (1929–2021)

Dinos Constantinides (Greek: Ντίνος Κωνσταντινίδης; 10 May 1929 – 20 July 2021) was a Greek-American composer of contemporary classical music.

Constantinides was born in Ioannina, Greece. He studied violin and music theory at the Greek Conservatory in Athens, then violin at the Juilliard School in New York. He received a master's degree in music from Indiana University Bloomington and a doctoral degree in composition from Michigan State University. He played violin in the State Orchestra in Athens for 10 years. Beginning in 1967, Constantinides taught at Louisiana State University, and he received a Boyd Professorship of Composition there in 1986. He also directed the university's New Music Festival and the Louisiana Sinfonietta. He received first prizes in the 1981 Brooklyn College International Chamber Competition, the 1985 First Midwest Chamber Opera Conference, and the 1997 Delius composition Contest Grand Prize. He died at the age of 92 on 20 July 2021.
