= Flipper (mascot) =

Mascot of the Miami Dolphins

Flipper was a mascot for the Miami Dolphins from 1966 to 1968. She was situated in a fish tank in the open (east) end of the Orange Bowl, and was trained to jump in the tank when a touchdown or field goal was scored.

== History ==
From 1964 to 1967 NBC aired a popular series starring a dolphin named "Flipper," which was set in southeast Florida and the Bahamas. The Dolphins used in the show lived at the Seaquarium on Key Biscayne. There were four different dolphins who played Flipper named Susie, Kathy, Patty, and Squirt.

In 1966, The Miami Dolphins became an expansion franchise in the American Football League. Given the location, team name, and popularity of the TV show, it was decided that the new team mascot would be named "Flipper", and they would use a live Dolphin from the show as the team mascot.

Team owner Joe Robbie struck a deal with both the City of Miami and the Miami Seaquarium to have one of the dolphins perform at home games. This required transporting the aquatic mammal to and from the game each Sunday. It was decided that Patty would be the dolphin used because she was comfortable travelling while the others were not.

Following the 1968 season, "Flipper" was no longer used as the team mascot. Owner Joe Robbie decided to cut ties with the mascot because both the City of Miami and the Seaquarium decided they would not continue to pay for tank repairs and transportation costs.
