= Flip Simmons =

Australian actor and musician

- Born: Canberra, ACT, Australia
- Origin: Australia
- Genres: Music Theatre, Gospel, Pop, Soul, Rhythm and blues,
- Occupations: Singer-songwriter, film, stage and voice actor
- Website: flipsimmons.com

Flip Simmons is an Australian actor and musician.

He is a graduate of St Edmund's College, Canberra, and Brent Street – School of Performing Arts.

Notably, he has performed with artists including George Benson, Josh Groban, John Farnham, Delta Goodrem, Natalie Bassingthwaighte and the Rogue Traders, Christine Anu, Paulini, Sharon and Christine Muscat (Sister2Sister), Rob Guest, internet sensation Miranda Sings.

Simmons is of English, Filipino, Irish, Spanish and Swedish heritage and is known to sing in multiple languages and genres. He has supported artists such as Anthony Castelo, Hajji Alejandro, Hannah Villame and the late Yoyoy Villame, on their Australian tours.

== Film and television ==
Film and television credits include; AFI Award winning Lantana, The ARIA Music Awards, The Helpmann Awards, Good Morning Australia, Midday, Mornings with Kerri-Anne and Celebrate! Christmas in the Capital, along with number of short films and music videos.

In New York in 2001, Simmons had castings for the Broadway and American touring companies of RENT for the roles of Angel and Mark, during which his audition process was broadcast in a television special on the musical on America's Fox Network.

== Theatre ==
Theatre work includes; extensive work with the Canberra Philharmonic, work with Opera Australia, touring Australia covering the role of Roger in Grease – The Arena Spectacular, and playing Nachum and Grandma Tzeitel next to the legendary Chaim Topol in the Australasian tour of Fiddler on the Roof.

He is currently playing the role of Ritchie Valens in the Australian tour of Buddy: The Buddy Holly Story in remembrance of the 50th anniversary of "The Day the Music Died".

== Music ==
At the age of three, Flip was entered into the Yamaha School of Music to play piano.

In 2000, he was invited to join Mi Tierra – Australia's leading Latin band, as a singer, dancer and flute player. His work with Mi Tierra has taken him around the country playing the majority of Australia's most prestigious festivals and concert events, also working as lyricist and concert choreographer.

He has also worked with dynamic performance group The Next Step at their sold-out shows "Live at The Metro", their "Do it on the dance floor" tour and at such festivals such as Splendour in the Grass.

Simmons is one of the founding members of the Sydney musical collaboration Sexy Sunday Jam, a band formed of session musicians and performers from Australia who came to notoriety from a weekly, industry-based event on a Sunday night in Sydney, established in 2010.

On Christmas 2014, he was a guest artist at the Pacific Grand Ballroom at the Waterfront in Cebu, Philippines, for the fashion designer Monique Lhuillier's family M Lhuillier's end-of-year party.
