= List of land mines =

Yugoslav MRUD anti-personnel mine (front, accessories fitted).

A Yugoslav MRUD anti-personnel mine (line drawing).

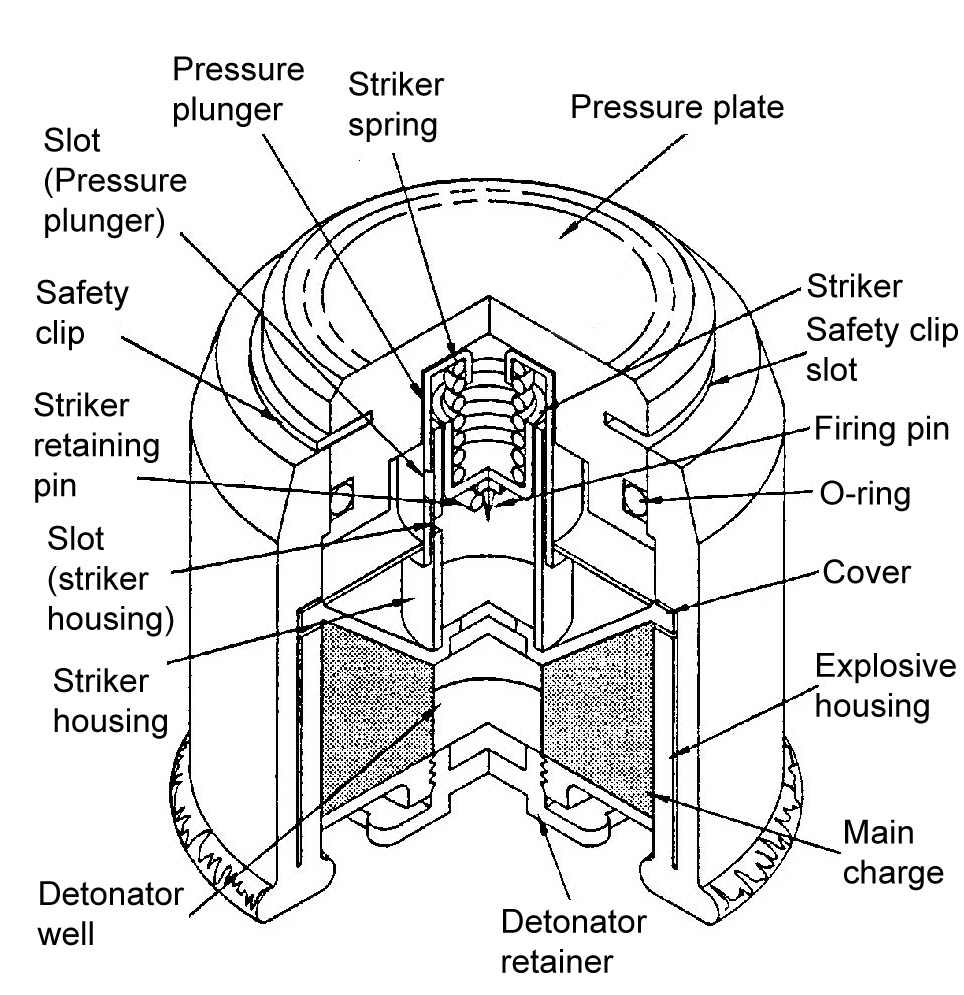
A cutaway of an MD-82 mine.

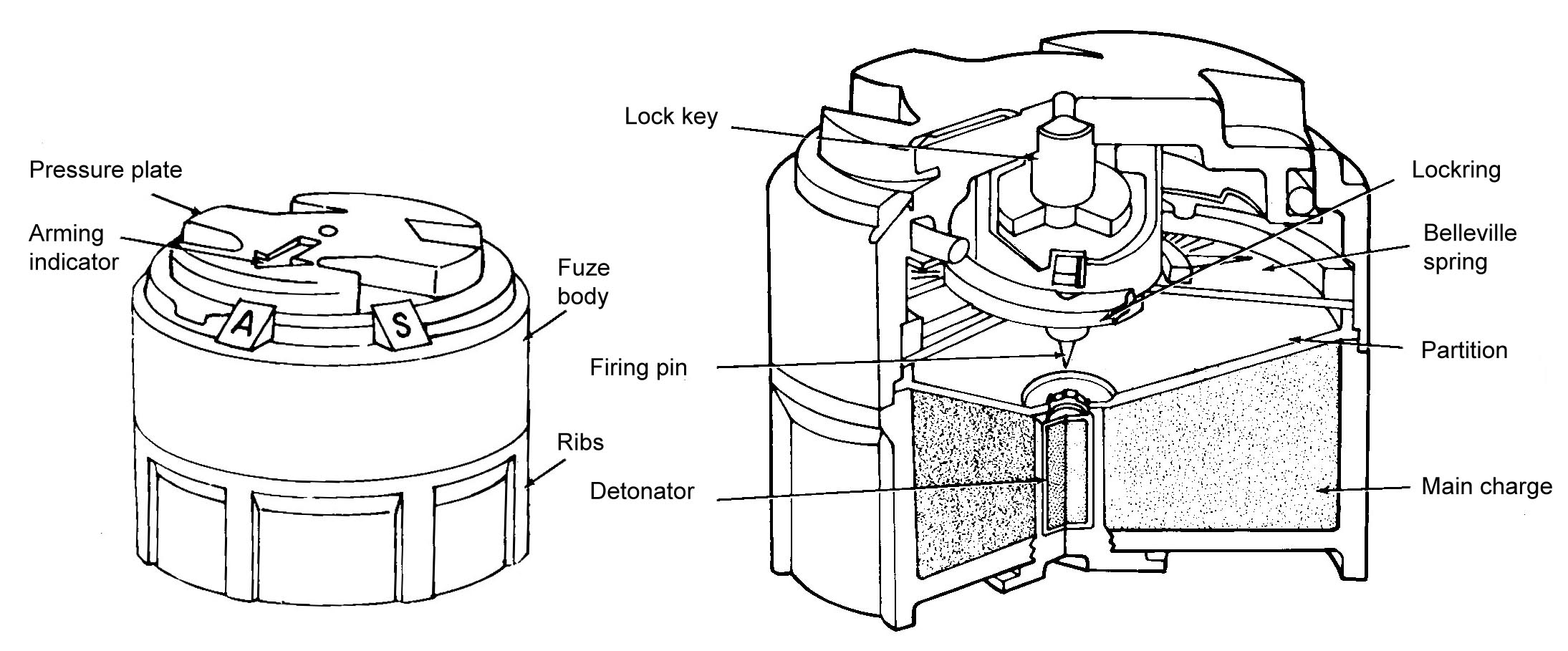
An M14 mine, showing a cutaway view. The absence of a safety clip and the location of the arrow on the pressure plate clearly shows that this mine has been armed.

This is a list of commonly used land mines.

== Mines by type ==
=== Anti-personnel ===
==== Fragmentation and stake mines ====
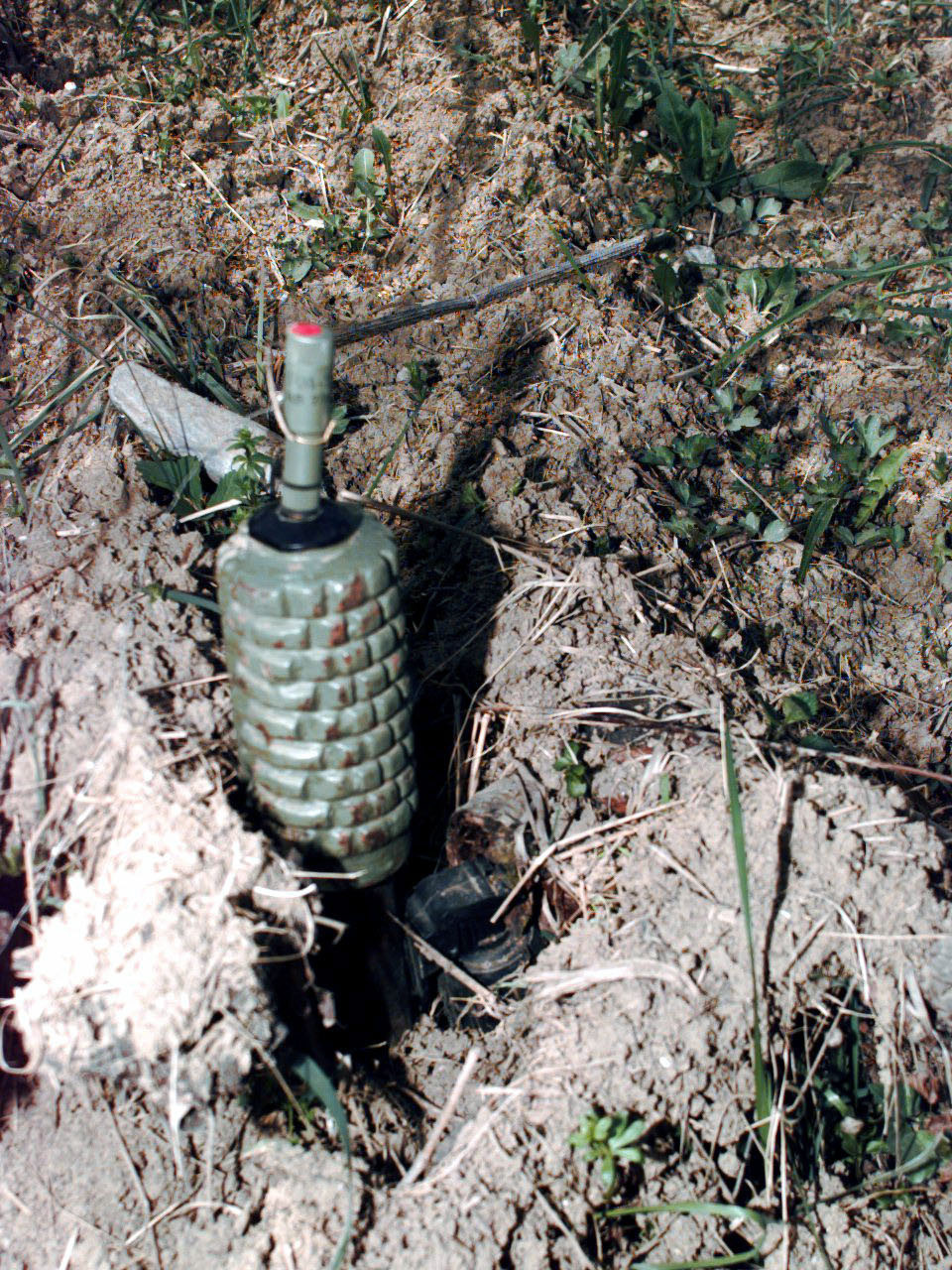
A Yugoslavian PMR-2A stake mine, in a typical deployed configuration. Note the externally serrated fragmentation jacket.

- AUPS fragmentation mine
- BLU-92
- BPM-1
- HB 876 mine
- M61 mine
- M63 mine
- M74 mine
- M421 mine
- MAP mine
- MBV-78-A1 mine
- MBV-78-A2 mine
- MM 1 mine
- Model 15 mine
- Model 49 mine
- MUSA mine
- MUSPA mine
- NO-MZ 2B mine
- NR-413 mine
- P-25 mine
- P-40 APPLE mine
- PM-43 mine
- PM-68 mine
- PMFC-1 mine
- PMFH-1 mine
- PMFH-2 mine,
- PMR-1 mine
- PMR-2 mine
- PMR-2A mine
- PMR-3 mine
- PMR-4 mine
- PMR-U mine
- POMD-1 mine
- POMZ
- POMZ-2 mine
- POMZ-2M mine
- PPMP-2 mine
- PP Mi-Sb mine
- PP Mi-Sk mine,
- SAPM mine
- Stock Mine
- Type 58 stake mine
- Type 59 stake mine
- Rangan 99
- Joni 95
- Ilavaluthi

==== Shaped charge mines ====
- C3A1 mine
- C3A2 mine

==== Directional mines ====
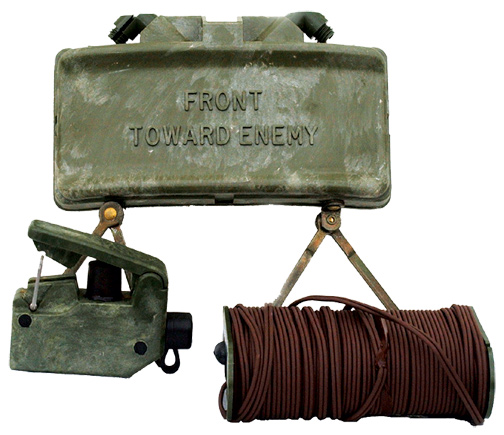
The M18A1 Claymore mine.

- APM-1 mine
- APM-2 mine
- APM-3 mine
- APM 19 mine
- APM 29 mine
- AVC 100 mine
- AVC 195 mine
- Cardoen Directional AP mine
- DFC 19 mine
- DFC 29 mine
- EC-2 mine
- FFV 013 mine
- FFV 013R mine
- HAMDY mine
- HM 1000 mine
- HzSMI NO. 80 mine
- K440 mine
- KM18A1 mine
- KN-10 mine
- M18A1 Claymore
- MAI-GA4 mine
- MAPED F1 mine
- MDH-10 mine
- MDH-C40 mine
- Mini MS 803 mine
- MM-1 minimore
- MM-2 mine
- M-25 mine
- MMN-1 mine
- MMN-2 mine
- MOB (landmine)
- Model 123 mine
- MON-50
- MON-90
- MON-100
- MON-200
- MRUD
- P5 series mine
- PADMINE
- PMN-150 mine
- PMN-250 mine
- Shrapnel No. 2 Mk 1 mine
- Shrapnel No. 2 R1M1 mine
- SM-70 mine
- SMI 17/4 C Giant Shotgun mine
- SMI 17/6 C mine
- SMI 20/1 C mine
- SMI 21/3 C mine
- SMI 21/11 C mine
- Type 58 stake mine
- Type 59 stake mine
- Type 66 mine
- Type 67 mine
- VS-DAFM 1
- VS-DAFM 6
- VS-DAFM 7

==== Blast mines ====
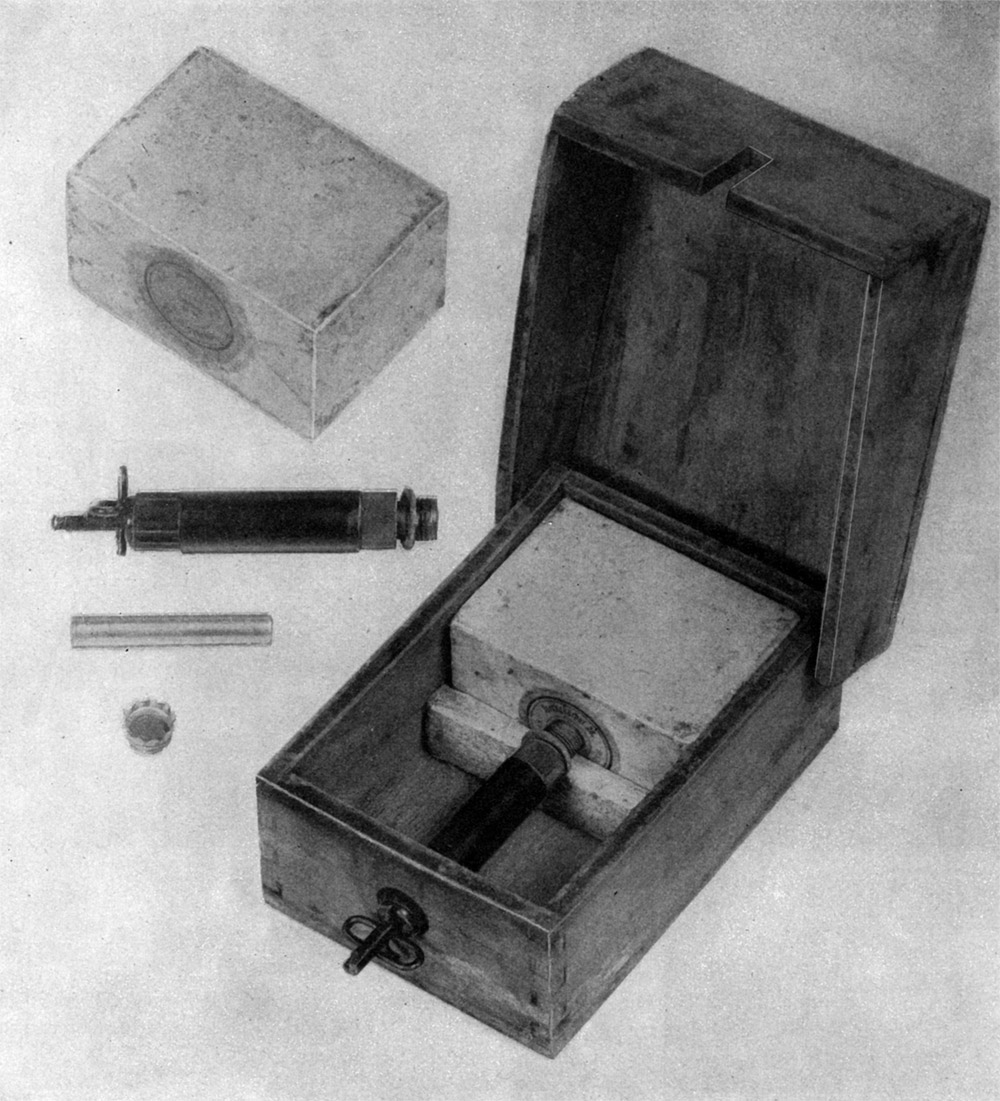
A German World War II era Schu-mine 42 anti-personnel mine. Its extremely simple design and use of wooden components allowed it to be produced in great numbers.

- AP NM AET1 mine
- APP M-57 AP blast mine
- AUPS mine
- BLU-43
- Chinese Scatterable AP mine
- Cuban AP blast mine
- DM-39 mine
- Egyptian AP plastic mine
- EM-20 mine
- FAMA AP mine
- FMK-1 mine
- GLD-112 mine
- GYATA-64 mine
- M14 mine
- M 49 mine
- M 61 mine
- M 62 mine
- M 63 mine
- M/80 mine
- M409 mine
- M412 mine
- M/966-B mine
- MAI-75 mine
- MAI-GR2 mine
- MAPG mine
- MAPP 78-F2 mine
- MAPPG mine
- MAPT 78-F2 mine
- MAPI mine
- MAPS/M/M41 mine
- MAT-68 mine
- MAUS mine
- MAUS-1 mine
- MD-82 mine
- MGP-30 mine
- MKKB mine
- Mle 1951 AP blast mine
- MI AP ID 51 mine
- MI AP DV 59 mine
- MM 2 mine
- MN-79 mine
- Model 15 mine
- Model 1989 mine
- MD-82 mine
- No 4 mine
- No 4 Italian AP mine
- No 6 AP mine
- No 7 Mk1 Dingbat mine
- No 10 mine
- NR 22C1 mine
- NR-408 mine
- P2 Mk2 AP blast mine
- P4 Mk1 AP blast mine
- P5 AP mine
- PATVAG 69 mine
- PFM-1
- PM-79 mine
- PMA-2 mine
- PMA-3 mine
- PMD-1 mine
- PMD-6 mine
- PMD-7 mine
- PMK-40 mine
- PMN mine
- PMN-2 mine
- PMN-3 mine
- PMN-4 mine
- PMP-71 mine
- PP Mi-Ba mine
- PP Mi-D mine
- PP Mi-Na 1 mine
- PRB-411 mine
- PRB M35 mine
- PPM-2 mine
- R mine
- Ranger AP mine
- S-Mine 35
- SAPEM mine
- SB-33 mine
- Schu-mine 42
- SM-65 mine
- T/78 mine
- T/79 mine
- T-AB 1 AP mine
- Tret-Mine 59
- TS-50 mine
- Type 58 blast mine
- Type 63 AP mine
- Type 67 AP mine
- Type 72 AP mine
- Type 93 mine
- Type 96 mine
- Type 99 mine
- VAR/40 mine
- VAR/100 mine
- VAR/100/SP mine
- VS-50 mine
- VS-MK2 mine
- VS-MK2-EL mine
- XM22
- XM27
- XM40E5
- XM41
- XM41E1
- XM44
- XM45E1
- XM65
- YM-1 mine
- YM-1B mine

==== Bounding mines ====
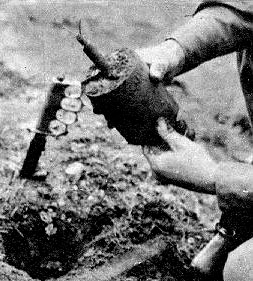
A World War II German S-mine, perhaps not the first bounding mine, but possibly the most well known. Its design was copied by several countries after the war including the United States who produced the M16 mine to replace their relatively ineffective M2 mine.

- Area Denial Artillery Munition
- AUS 50/5 mine
- BM/85 mine
- Chinese portable bounding AP mine
- Egyptian bounding AP mines
- DM-31 mine
- M2 mine
- M16 mine
- M26 mine
- M/66 mine
- M86 pursuit deterrent munition
- M432 mine
- M/966 mine
- Mle 1939 mine
- Mle 1951 mine
- Mle 1955 mine
- No 12 mine
- NR-23C2 mine
- NR-442 mine
- S-mine (the "Bouncing Betty")
- Valmara 59
- Valmara 69
- VS-APFM1 mine
- VS-JAP mine
- Type 69 mine
- OZM-3 mine
- OZM-4 mine
- OZM-72 mine
- OZM-160 mine
- P3 mine
- P7 mine
- P-40 mine
- PP-Mi-Sr mine
- PRB M966 mine
- PROM-1 mine
- PROM-KD mine
- PSM-1 mine
- OZM-3
- OZM-4
- OZM-72
- VS-SAPFM3 mine

==== Flame mines ====
- Abwehrflammenwerfer 42
- Flame fougasse
- X-200 mine
- XM-54 mine

==== Chemical mines ====
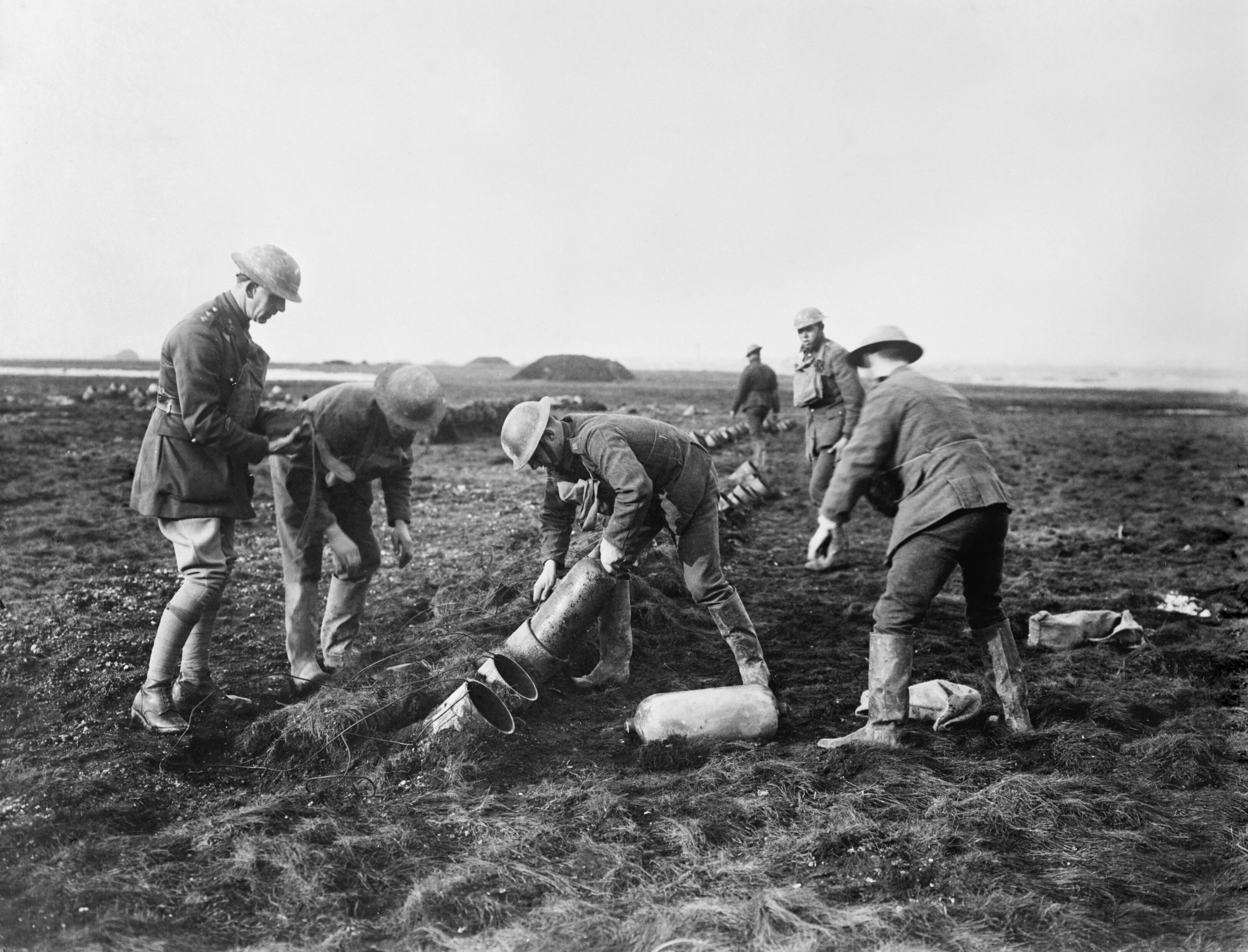
British troops load a Livens gas projector.

- Livens Projector _{see note}
- KhF-1 bounding gas mine
- KhF-2 bounding gas mine
- M1 chemical mine
- M23 chemical mine
- Spruh-Buchse 37
- Yperite mine

=== Anti-vehicle mines ===
==== Blast mines ====
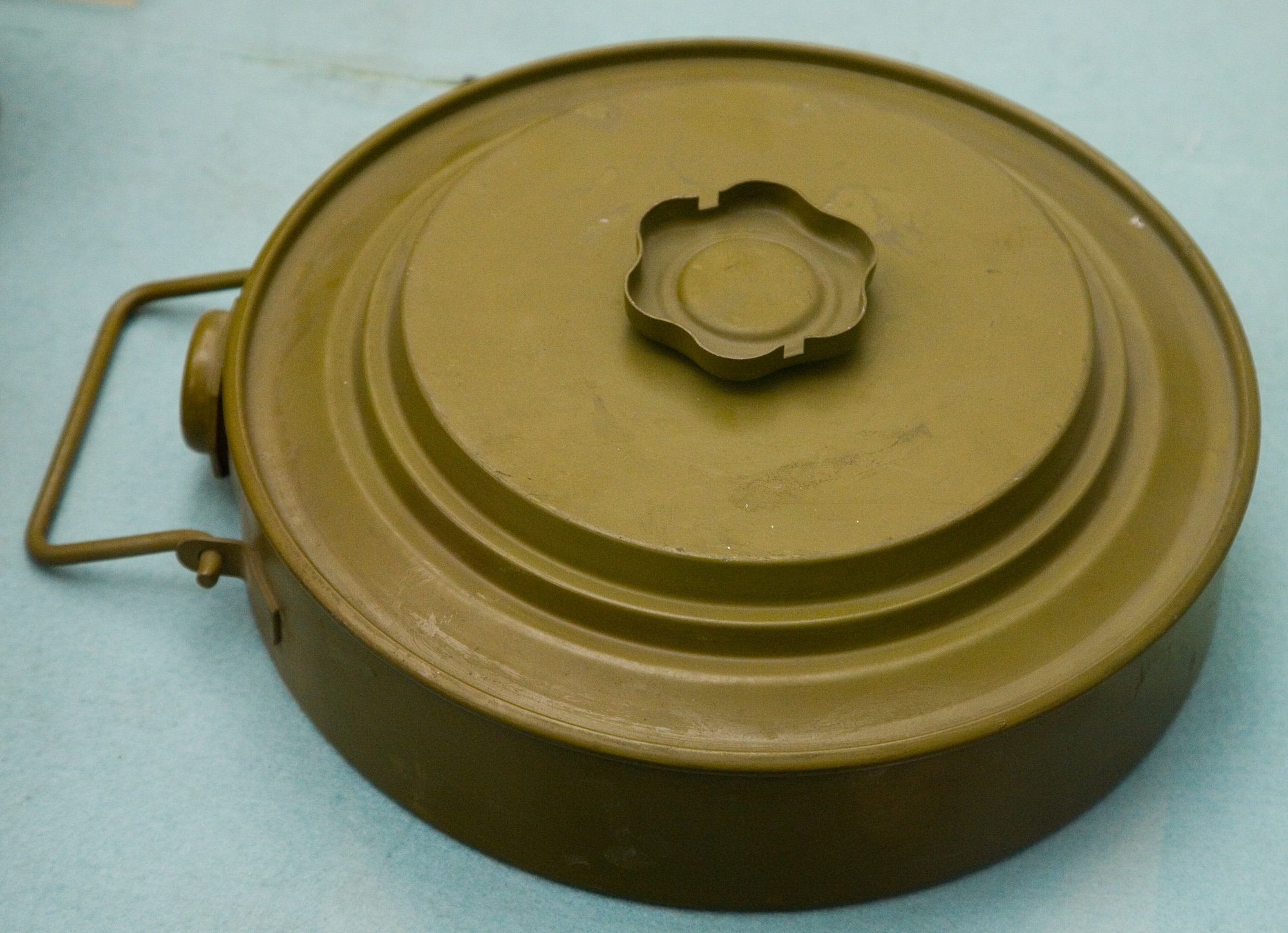
A Chinese metal-cased Type 59 anti-tank blast mine. Its design is typical of many post World War II anti-tank blast mines, circular with a central fuze well (fitted with a plug in this case).

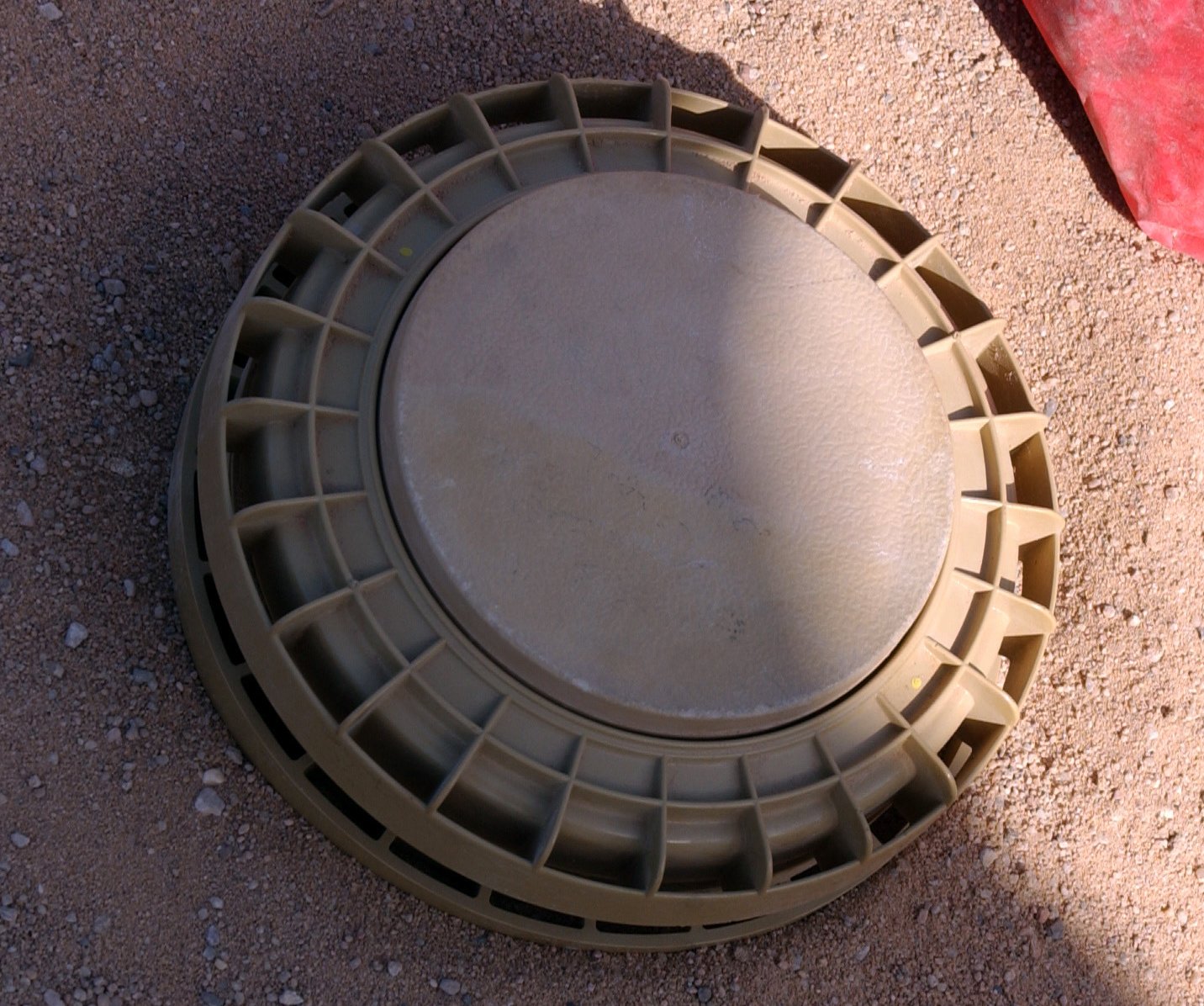
An Italian, plastic cased blast resistant VS-2.2 mine. Capable of being deployed from the air, as well as being resistant to explosive clearance techniques.

- AC NM AE T1 mine
- ADWAT mine
- AT-8 (Cuban mine)
- ATM-72 mine
- ATM-74 mine
- ATM 75 mine
- ATM 96 mine
- BLU-91
- C-3-A/B mine
- Cardoen AT mine
- CC 48 mine
- CS 42/2 mine
- CS 42/3 mine
- DM-11 mine
- DM-21 mine
- Flachmine 17
- FMK-3 mine
- FMK-5 mine
- Hawkins grenade
- LPZ mine
- M/47 mine
- M1 mine
- M1A1
- M4 mine
- M5 mine
- M6 mine
- M7 mine
- M15 mine
- M19 mine
- M51 MACI mine
- M52 MACI mine
- M/71 mine
- M75 mine
- M/80 mine
- M453 mine
- M1935 mine
- M1936 mine
- MAT/5 mine
- MAT/6 mine
- MAT-62B mine
- MAT-76 mine
- MAT.84-F5 mine
- MATS/1.4 mine
- MATS/2 mine
- MATS/2.6 mine
- MGP-31 mine
- MI AC PR mine
- Mk 2 mine
- Mk 3 mine
- Mk 4 mine
- Mk 5 mine
- Mk 7 mine
- MKT Mod 72 mine
- MKTBT mine
- Model 41-47 mine
- Model 47 mine
- Model 47-52 mine
- Model 52 mine
- Model 67 mine
- Model 1948 mine
- MP-APVL 83-F4 mine
- MPP-B Wierzba mine
- Na-Mi-Ba mine
- No 6 mine
- No 8 mine
- NR 25 mine
- NR 26 mine
- NV-41 mine
- P2 Mk2 mine
- P3 Mk2 mine
- Panssarimiina m/36
- Panssarimiina m/39
- Panssarimiina m/S-39
- Panssarimiina m/S-40
- Panssarimiina m/44
- Pappmine
- PDM-1 mine
- PDM-1M mine
- PDM-2 mine
- PDM-2M mine
- PDM-6 mine
- Pignone mine P-1
- Pignone mine P-2
- PM-60 mine (K-1 mine)
- PMZ-40 mine
- PRB M3 mine
- PRB-111 mine
- PT-56 mine
- PT Mi-Ba mine
- PT Mi-Ba-II mine
- PT Mi-Ba-III mine
- PP Mi-D mine
- PT Mi-K mine
- PTM-1
- PTM-80P mine
- SACI mine
- SB-81 mine
- SBP-04 mine
- SBP-07 mine
- SH-55 mine
- T-IV mine
- T-AB-1 AT mine
- TC/2.4 mine
- TC/3.6 mine
- TC/6 mine
- Tellermine 29
- Tellermine 35
- Tellermine 42
- Tellermine 43
- TMM-1
- TMA-1 mine
- TMA-2 mine
- TMA-3 mine
- TMA-4 mine
- TMA-5 mine
- TMB-1 mine
- TMB-2 mine
- TMN-46 mine
- TMSB mine
- TM-35 mine
- TM-38 mine
- TM-41 mine
- TM-44 mine
- TM-46 mine
- TM-57 mine
- TM-62 mine
- TM-65 mine
- TMD-1 mine
- TMD-2 mine
- TMD-40 mine
- TMD-44 mine
- TMD-B mine
- TMM-1 mine
- Topfmine A
- Topfmine B
- Topfmine C
- TQ-Mi mine
- Type I bakelite anti-tank mine
- Type 2 AT mine
- Type II bakelite anti-tank mine
- Type 3 mine
- Type 9 wooden anti-tank mine
- Type 63 AT mine
- Type 72 metallic
- Type 72 non-metallic
- Type 93 mine
- Type 96 mine
- Type 99 mine
- Volcano mine system
- VS-1.6 mine
- VS-2.2 mine
- VS-3.6 mine
- VS-AT4 mine
- YaM-5 box mine
- YM-II mine
- YM-III mine

==== Shaped charge/Misnay Schardin effect ====
- Adrushy mine
- ARGES mine
- AT2 mine
- ATM 6 mine
- ATM 7 mine
- ATM 2000E
- BAT/7 mine
- FFV 016 mine
- FFV 028 mine
- HAK-1 mine
- Hohl-Sprung mine 4672
- HPD-1 mine
- HPD-2 mine
- HPD-3 mine
- K441/442 mine
- Kasia 100/170 mine
- L14A1 mine
- KB-PTM mine
- KRIZNA-D mine
- M21 mine
- M-24 mine
- MC-71 mine
- MIACAH F1 mine
- MI AC Disp F1 Minotaur mine
- MIFF mine
- Mine Anti-Tank Non-detectable 1A
- Mine Anti-Tank Non-detectable 3A
- MN-111 mine
- MN-121 mine
- MN-123 mine
- MPB mine
- MSM MK2 mine
- MUSA mine
- MUSPA mine
- No 8 mine
- Panzer stab 43
- PARM 1 mine
- PARM 2 mine
- PD Mi-PK mine
- PT Mi-D1 mine
- PT Mi-P mine
- PT Mi-U mine
- PTM-3 mine
- Pz Mi 88 mine
- SATM mine
- SB-MV/1 mine
- SLAM mine
- T-93 mine
- TM-72 mine
- TM-83 mine
- TM-89 mine
- TMK-2 mine
- TMRP-7 mine
- Type 84 mine
- UKA-63 mine
- VS-HCT mine
- VS-HCT2 mine
- VS-HCT4 mine
- VS-SATM1 mine

==== Full width mines ====
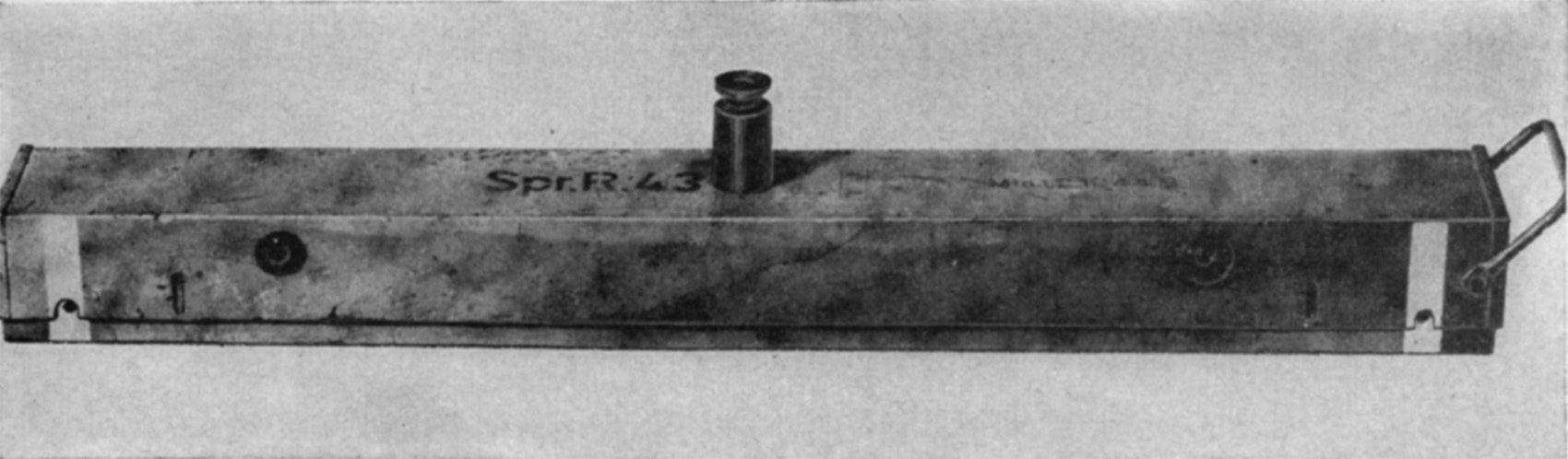
A German Riegelmine 43 full width mine.

- Barmine
- BAT/7 mine
- FFV 028 (Stridsvagnsmina 6) mine
- MSM MK2 mine
- Riegel mine 43
- Riegel mine 44
- V-3 (N5) mine
- VS-HCT mine
- VS-HCT2 mine
- VS-HCT4 mine

==== Side attack mines ====
- Addermine
- Anti-Transport Mine
- ARGES/MACPED mine
- ATIS mine
- ATM 6 mine
- ATM 7 mine
- AVC 100 mine
- AVC 195 mine
- FFV 018 mine
- L14A1 mine
- Kasia 100 mine
- Kasia 2 x 100 mine
- Kasia 170 mine
- M24 mine
- MON-100
- MON-200
- MPB mine
- PARM 1 mine
- PARM 2 mine
- PD Mi-PK mine
- PMN-150 mine
- PMN-250 mine
- TEMP 30 mine
- TM-83 mine

==== Wide area mines ====
- M93 HORNET mine
- PTKM - 1R

=== Anti-helicopter mines ===
- 4AHM-100 mine
- AHM-200 mine
- AHM-200-1 mine
- AHM-200-2 mine
- Anti-Transport Mine
- Helkir mine
- PMN-150 mine
- PMN-250 mine
- TEMP 20

=== Nuclear land mines ===
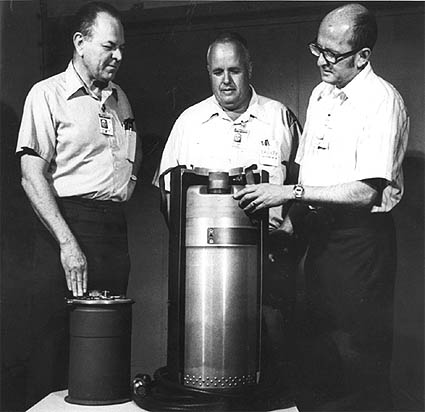
Three scientists pose with a Medium Atomic Demolition Munition, the warhead is the smaller cylinder to the left, its casing is to the right.

- Blue Peacock
- Medium Atomic Demolition Munition
- Special Atomic Demolition Munition

== Mines by country of origin ==
=== Argentina ===
- FMK-1 mine
- FMK-3 mine
- FMK-5 mine
- MAPG mine
- MAPPG mine

=== Austria ===
- Helkir mine

=== Bulgaria ===
- 4AHM-100 mine
- AHM-200 mine
- AHM-200-1 mine
- AHM-200-2 mine
- Anti Transport Mine (Bulgaria)
- PMN-150 mine
- PMN-250 mine

=== Canada ===
- C3A1 mine
- DM-21 mine

=== China ===
- Type 84
- Type 72 metallic
- Type 72 non-metallic
- Type 66
- Type 59
- Type 58
- Chinese Scatterable AP mine
- Type 58 blast mine
- Type 63 AP mine
- Type 67 AP mine
- Type 72 AP mine
- Type 69 mine
- Chinese portable bounding AP mine

=== Cuba ===
- AT-8 (Cuban mine)
- PMFH-1 mine
- PMFH-2 mine

=== Former Czechoslovakia ===
- PP Mi-SK mine (a Czechoslovak copy of the POMZ-2 mine, used with an RO-1 fuze)

=== Sweden ===
- M/47 mine
- FFV 016 mine
- FFV 028 mine

=== France ===
- MAPED F1 (France)
- Model 1948 mine

=== Germany ===
- Abwehrflammenwerfer 42
- AT-2 mine
- Flachmine 17
- Glasmine 43
- Hohl-Sprung mine 4672
- Panzer stab 43
- PARM 1 mine
- Riegel mine 43
- S-mine
- Schu-mine 42
- Spruh-Buchse 37
- Tellermine 29
- Tellermine 35
- Tellermine 42
- Tellermine 43
- Topfmine

=== Italy ===
- SB-33 mine
- TS-50 mine
- Valmara 69
- VAR/40 mine
- VS-50 mine
- VS-1.6 mine
- VS-2.2 mine

=== Japan ===
- Type 93 mine
- Type 96 mine
- Type 67 mine
- Type 99 mine

=== Myanmar ===
- MM-1 mine

=== South Africa ===
- Mini MS-803 (South Africa)

=== Serbia ===
- MRUD (Serbia)

=== Former Soviet Union/Russia ===
- MON-200
- MON-100
- MON-90
- MON-50
- OZM-3
- OZM-4
- OZM-72
- POMZ
- POMZ-2
- POMZ-2M
- TMN-46 mine
- TM-57 mine
- TM-62 mine
- TM-72 mine
- TM-83 mine
- TM-89 mine
- PTKM - 1R

=== Sri Lanka ===
- Johnny Landmine 95 (LTTE)
- Rangan 99
- P4Mk1
- Type 72

=== United Kingdom ===
- Barmine
- Blue Peacock
- Hawkins grenade
- HB 876 mine
- Livens Projector _{see note}
- Mk 2 mine
- Mk 3 mine
- Mk 4 mine
- Mk 5 mine
- Mk 7 mine
- No 7 Mk1 Dingbat mine

=== United States ===
- Area Denial Artillery Munition
- BLU-14
- BLU-43
- BLU-91
- BLU-92
- M1 mine
- M5 mine
- M6 mine
- M7 mine
- M14 mine
- M15 mine
- M16 mine
- M18A1 Claymore Antipersonnel Mine
- M19 mine
- M21 mine
- M74 mine
- M75 mine
- M86 pursuit deterrent munition
- M93 HORNET mine
- Medium Atomic Demolition Munition
- X-200 mine
- XM22 mine
- XM27 mine
- XM40E5 mine
- XM41 mine
- XM41E1 mine
- XM44 mine
- XM45E1 mine
- XM-54 mine
- XM65 mine

=== Former Yugoslavia ===
- MRUD (Serbia)
- PROM-1
- PMA-2 "Pašteta"
- PMA-3 mine
- PMR-1 mine
- PMR-2A mine
- TMM-1

=== Vietnam ===
- MD-82 mine
- MBV-78A1 mine

== See also ==
- Fougasse
- Mine clearance agencies
- Demining
- Hydrema mine clearing vehicle
- Virtual minefield
- The Ottawa Treaty
- Special Atomic Demolition Munition
- Uzbek-Tajikistan border minefields
