= AT-8 =

AT-8 may refer to:

- AT-8, a World War II training aircraft
- AT-8 (Cuban mine), a Cuban anti-tank mine
- AT-8 Songster, an anti-tank missile
