= VAR series of mines =

The VAR/40, VAR/100 and VAR/100/SP are Italian anti-personnel blast landmines produced by the Tecnovar italiana S.p.A. company.

== VAR/40 ==
VAR series of mines

The VAR/40 is a small landmine, designed to be carried by individual soldiers and hand laid. It was initially produced for the Italian army in the 1970s, and was exported to a large number of countries. The mines body is circular with a ribbed plastic body split into upper and lower halves. The upper half holds the pressure-sensitive fuze mechanism, which is covered by a truncated rubber cone. The fuze is covered by a safety cap that prevents accidental activation. The safety cap also has a threaded well, which holds the detonator during transit.

The mine is armed by transferring the detonator from the fuze cap to the well in the base of the mine, the safety cap is then removed. Pressure on the central pressure plate, compresses the spring until the pressure is enough to shear the plastic retaining pins.

It is a minimum metal design. It's normally deployed with the main body underground with the raised pressure fuze protruding above ground. The mine can be laid underwater and doesn't float. It is moderately resistant to overpressure due to the small surface area of the pressure fuze.

The mine is no longer in production and Italian operational stocks of the mine have been destroyed (a stockpile of 1,420,636 mines). Thailand also held stocks of the mine. It's found in Angola, Iraq and Turkey.

== VAR/100 ==
The VAR/100 is a larger version of the VAR/40 it uses a larger main charge (100 grams of RDX explosive instead of 40 grams, hence the name of both) but is otherwise identical. The mine is no longer in production, and is found in Mozambique.

== VAR/100/SP ==
The VAR/100/SP is a VAR/100 mine fitted with a 1.6 kilogram cast iron fragmentation jacket identical to the one used with the AUPS mine. The mine is mounted on an 800 millimeter high stake. On detonation the jacket breaks into approximately 500 fragments with a lethal range of about 25 meters. The fuze is different from the VAR/100 - the SP version uses a three pronged pressure and tilt fuze that can be used with tripwires.

The mine is no longer in production.

== Specifications ==
Name	VAR/40	VAR/100	VAR/100/SP
Height	45 mm	57 mm	138 mm
Diameter	78 mm	78 mm	120 mm
Weight	0.1 kg	0.17 kg	1.77 kg
Explosive content	0.04 kg	0.1 kg	0.1 kg
Operating pressure	12 kg		12 kg 6 kg traction

== Gallery ==
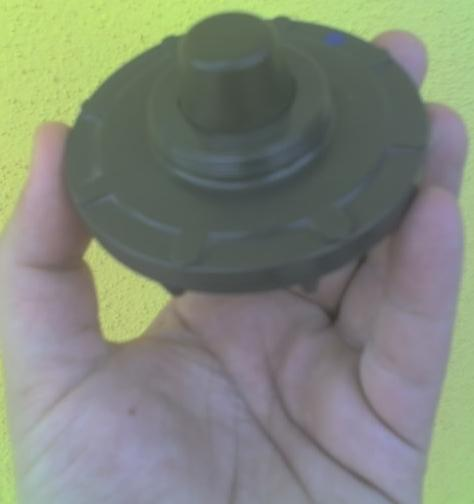
TECNOVAR VAR/40 - Safety cap removed, rubber cone in sight.

TECNOVAR VAR/40 - Disassembled showing the upper halve of the top part, blue and green caps stand respectively for the fuse in transport position (to be carried in the due space inside the safety cap) and for the fuse in operational position.

TECNOVAR VAR/40 - Disassembled showing the inner halve of the top, pressure plate in sight.
