= POMD-1 mine =

Bulgarian anti-personnel mine

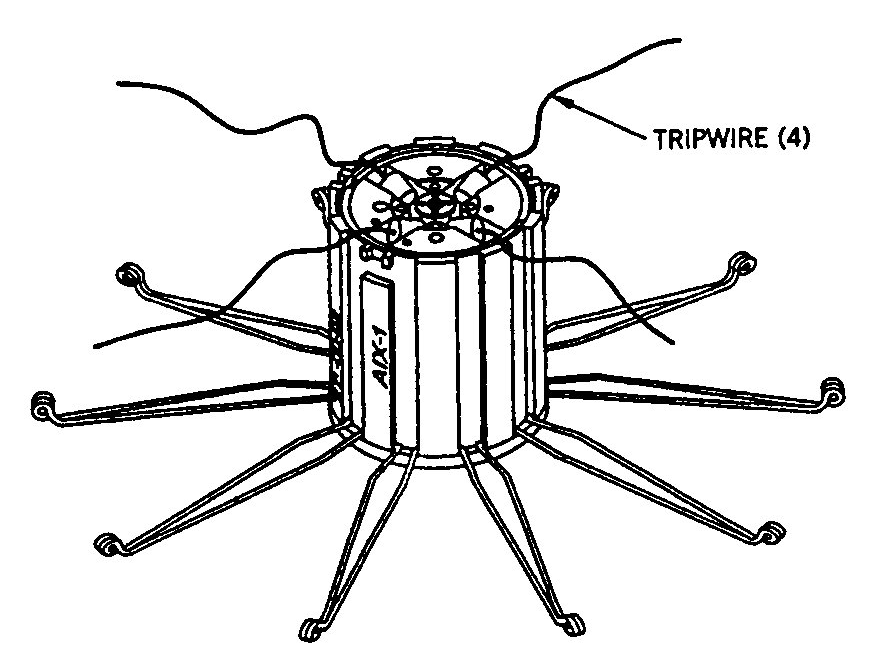
A POMD-1 scatterable AP mine.

The POMD-1 is a cylindrical scatterable Bulgarian anti-personnel mine, used in the KNURS-DM 122 mm rocket fired from the BM-21 vehicle mounted rocket launcher. In one 122 mm rocket, a single POMD-1 mine was carried along with 16 PMD-1 AP pressure mines, and four TMD-1 anti-tank mines.

Once the mine is scattered, the top is ejected, allowing the spring-loaded legs to fold down. Also four tripwires are launched away from the mine. After a short period the mine is armed, from that point on, any disturbance of the trip wires will trigger the mine, scattering fragments to a lethal radius of approximately 15 meters.

The mine has been withdrawn from Bulgarian service and all stocks have been destroyed.

== Specifications ==
- Diameter: 112 mm
- Height: 135 mm
- Weight: 2.7 kg
- Explosive content: 250 g of A-IX-1
