= Helkir mine =

- Type: Directional mine, anti-helicopter

Specifications
- Mass: 43 kg
- Maximum firing range: 500 m
- Filling weight: 20 kg
- Detonation mechanism: Acoustic & IR sensors

The Helkir is an anti-helicopter mine developed by the Austrian company Hirtenberger. It uses an IR sensor and an acoustic sensor to detect airborne targets. Once the mine is armed and ready to engage, the acoustic sensor listens for a valid noise input. This enables the IR sensor which is located coaxially to the warhead. When the IR sensor detects a hot signature, the mine blasts off fragments that can penetrate up to 6 mm of armored steel at 50 meters and 2 mm of mild steel at 150 meters. The mine is active for a period of 1 to 120 days, after which it returns to a safe mode.

Helkir, as well as other mines developed by Hirtenberger, like the APM-1 and the APM-2 anti-personnel directional mines (discontinued in 1994), do not appear on the company's current website.

== See also ==
- Bulgarian anti-helicopter mines
- List of land mines
