= NR 26 mine =

Dutch anti-tank blast mine

The NR 26 is a Dutch circular minimum metal anti-tank blast mine similar to the French M51 MACI. The mine uses an NR 26 friction pressure fuze with a sheer collar designed to give way at a load of 350 kg. Two secondary fuze wells for anti-handling devices are fitted to the side and base of the mine, and carrying handle is fitted to the side of the mine.

The mine is currently in service with the Royal Netherlands Army

== Specifications ==
- Diameter: 300 mm
- Height: 120 mm
- Weight: 9 kg
- Explosive content: 8.9 kg of TNT
- Operating pressure: 350 kg
