= TQ-Mi mine =

Anti-tank blast mine

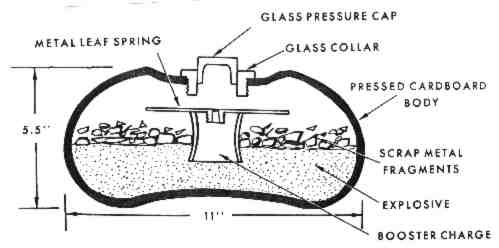
A cross section of a TQ-Mi landmine, note the kidney shape.

The TQ-Mi is an obsolete circular Czechoslovak anti-tank blast mine. The mines body is made of cardboard impregnated with asphalt. A central pressure cap is made of glass, which sits on top of a chemical fuze, which is crushed open onto the booster charge. The booster charge is embedded in the TNT main charge, above which are a number of scrap metal fragments, giving a secondary anti-personnel effect.

It has now been withdrawn from service with the Czech and Slovak armies.

== Specifications ==
- Diameter: 560 mm
- Height: 150 mm
- Weight: 10 kg
- Explosive content: 5.21 kg of TNT with a 0.1 kg booster charge
- Operating pressure: 320 kg
