= CS 42/3 mine =

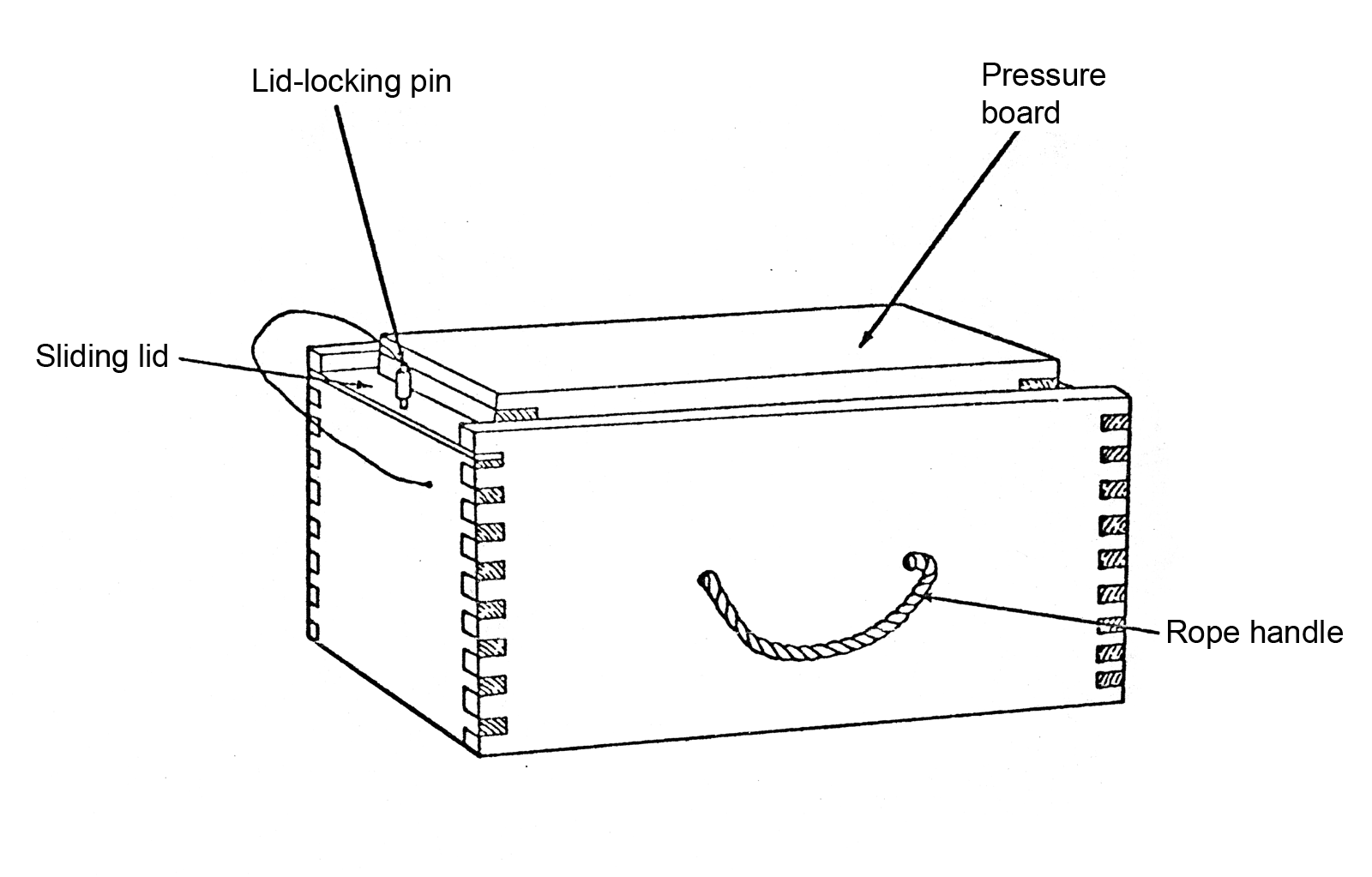
A diagram of a CS 42-3 landmine.

The CS 42/3 is an Italian wooden cased anti-tank mine used during the Second World War. Like the earlier CS 42/2 mine it uses four PMC 43 fuzes. It is a minimum metal mine, containing no metal.

== Specifications ==
- Dimensions: 284 x 236 x 144 millimeters
- Operating pressure: 220 lbs
- Explosive content: 11 lbs of TNT
