= MMN-2 mine =

Anti-personnel fragmentation mine

The MMN-2 is a Georgian Claymore type directional anti-personnel fragmentation mine. The mine projects fragments in a 45-degree horizontal arc to a casualty radius of forty meters.

== Specifications ==
- Weight: 2.26 kg
- Length: 168 mm
- Depth: 60 mm
- Height: 238 mm
- Explosive content: 0.6 kg
