= SATM mine =

Chinese copy of the AT2 scatterable anti-tank mine

The SATM mine is a Chinese copy of the AT2 scatterable anti-tank mine. It is scattered either from a mine scattering vehicle or by 122 mm Type 84 artillery rockets which hold eight mines each. The mine functions in the same way as the AT-2 with a seismic sensor that activates the mine and a magnetic influence sensor combined with a "scraping wire" sensor to ensure optimum detonation.

== Specifications ==
- Weight: 2.2 kg
- Diameter: 114 mm
- Height (excluding scraping wire fuze): 125 mm
