= Model 49 mine =

Swiss anti-personnel stake mine

The Model 49 is a large cylindrical Swiss anti-personnel stake mine. The mine is no longer in service with Swiss forces and all operational stocks of the mine have been destroyed. The mine is normally stake mounted, and uses the ZDZ-39 fuze, which can be operated by either pull or tension release. The mine has a concrete fragmentation jacket with embedded steel fragments.

== Specifications ==
- Diameter: 150 mm
- Height: 220 mm
- Weight: 8.62 kg
- Explosive content: 0.5 kg of TNT
- Operating pressure: 8 kgf (80 N) pull or tension release
