= SACI mine =

The SACI is an Italian Bakelite cased minimum metal anti-tank blast landmine. A number of variants were produced with varying amounts of explosive. The mine has three fuze wells on the top surface, that are covered with a pressure plate. Several types of fuzes were made including a low metal fuze. Combined with the low metal fuze the mine is very difficult to detect with mine detectors.

The mine can be fitted with anti-handling devices, it has two secondary fuze wells, one in the base, one in the side. The mine's case is prone to disintegrating in hot dry conditions, which can expose the bare fuzes reducing the activation pressure of the mine. The mine is found in Jordan, and Nicaragua. A variant of the mine designed and manufactured in Egypt and its use has been reported in Somalia.

== Specifications (SACI 54/7) ==
- Weight: 8.23 kg
- Explosive content: 7 kg of TNT (explosive)
- Diameter: 282 mm,
- Height: 205 mm
- Operating pressure: 100 to 200 kg

== Variants ==
- SACI 54/5 - with 5 kg of explosive
- SACI 54/7 - with 7 kg of explosive
  - B Mk 1 mine - An Egyptian copy of the 54/7
- SACI 54/9 - with 9 kg of explosive
