= BM/85 mine =

Anti-personnel mine

The BM/85 is an Italian blast resistant bounding anti-personnel mine that was produced by Tecnovar italiana SpA. The mine is cylindrical with a three pronged tilt/pressure fuze on the top with a central post for attaching a tripwire. A plastic safety clip prevents the fuze from tilting when in transit. Once the pressure clip is removed the mine is armed. Once the fuze is pulled sideways by a trip wire or by downward pressure, the mine is triggered. A small charge launches the mine to a height of about 0.45 meters where it explodes scattering 1,000 fragments to a lethal radius of about 25 meters.

The mine is similar to the Valmara 69, both share a similar fuze mechanism which is resistant to blast overpressure making them difficult to clear rapidly.

The mine was in service with the Italian army but all operational stocks of the mine have been destroyed.

== Specifications ==
- Diameter: 120 mm
- Height: 200 mm
- Weight: 2 kg
- Explosive content: 0.45 kg of Composition B
