= ATM-74 mine =

Land mine

The ATM-74 is a North Korean wooden box mine, it is a copy of the Soviet TMD-B. It is a wooden box packed with blocks of TNT, the top of the mine has three planks of wood underneath the central plank is a pressure fuze similar to Soviet MV-5 pressure fuze.

== Specifications ==
- Length: 320 mm
- Width: 290 mm
- Height: 160 mm
- Weight: 9 kg
- Explosive content: 6 kg of TNT
- Operating pressure: 200 to 500 kg
