= PT Mi-P mine =

Anti-tank mine

The PT Mi-P is a large Czechoslovak anti-tank mine. The mine is a large hemisphere, with a carrying handle and an RO-9 attachment for a tilt rod on one side. It uses a large shaped charge warhead that uses a five millimeter thick steel liner, and can penetrate up to 150 millimeters of armour. The mine was in service with the armies of the Czech Republic and Slovakia, but is now obsolete.

== Specifications ==
- Height: 238 mm
- Diameter: 266 mm
- Length of tilt rod: 500 mm (adjustable)
- Weight: 10 kg
- Explosive content: 5.8 kg of TNT
- Operating pressure: 5 kg tilt.
