= MATS/1.4 mine =

Italian anti-tank mine

The MATS/1.4 is a scatterable Italian circular, plastic-cased minimum metal blast-resistant anti-tank blast mine. It uses a pneumatic fuze which is resistant to shock and blast. The mine's plastic case is waterproof, and the mine can be scattered from a helicopter travelling at up to 200 km/h. The mine is normally tan-colored. The mine's main charge is relatively small, so when hand-emplaced the mine can be stacked, to increase its effect.

The mine is no longer in production.

== Specifications ==
- Diameter: 220 mm
- Height: 90 mm
- Weight: 3.6 kg
- Explosive content: 1.5 kg
