= NO-MZ 2B mine =

Vietnamese anti-personnel fragmentation mine

The NO-MZ 2B is a Vietnamese anti-personnel fragmentation mine. The mine has a simple cylindrical metal body, with an MUV fuze screwed into the top of the mine. The main charge is surrounded by a number of steel fragments embedded in wax.

The mine is found in Cambodia and Vietnam as well as possibly Laos and Thailand.

== Specifications ==
- Height: 80 mm
- Diameter: 57 mm
- Weight: 0.66 kg
- Explosive content: 0.065 kg of TNT
- Operating pressure: 2 to 5 kg of pull
