= Stock mine =

Munitions

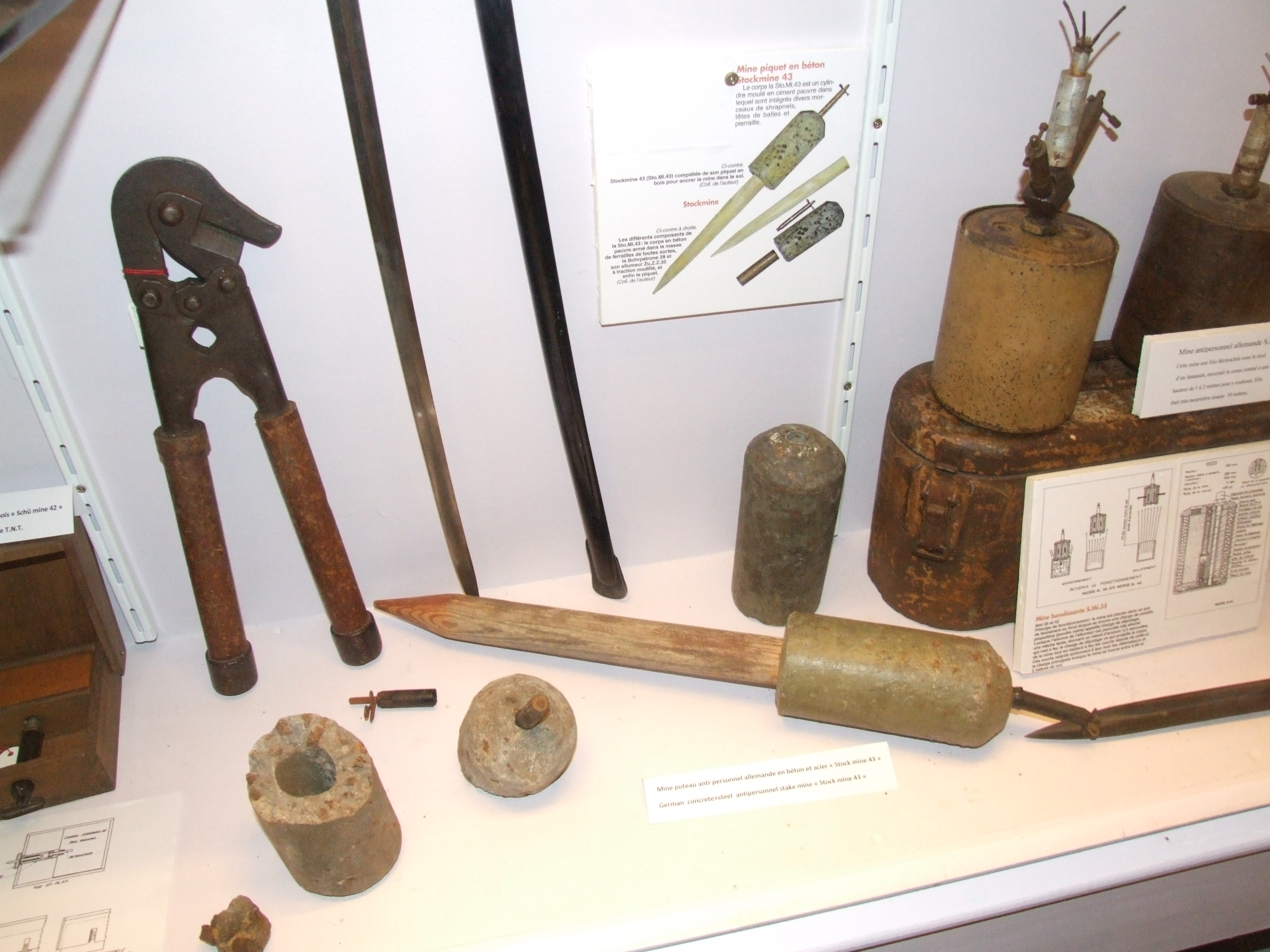
Stockmine M43

The Stockmine ("stick mine"), also Betonmine ("concrete mine"), was a German anti-personnel stake mine used during the Second World War. It consisted of a cylindrical concrete main body on top of a short wooden stake. The concrete head contained a small TNT bursting charge, and was embedded with metal fragments. A fuze is fitted to a central fuze well on the top of the mine. It could be used with a range of fuzes including the ZZ 35, ZZ 42 and ZU ZZ 35 that would trigger on either a tripwire pull or release.

Copies of the mine were produced after the war by different countries including the Cuban PMFC-1, the Czechoslovak PP-Mi-Sb, and the Yugoslavian PMR-2 which is found in Bosnia and Croatia.

== Specifications ==
| | Stock Mine | PMFC-1 | PMR-2 | PP Mi-Sb |
|---|---|---|---|---|
| Height (excluding stake) | 165 mm (6.5 in) | 150 mm (5.9 in) | 180 mm (7.1 in) (approx) | 140 mm (5.5 in) |
| Diameter | 70 mm (2.8 in) | 75 mm (3 in) | 80 mm (3.1 in) | 75 mm (3 in) |
| Weight | 2 kg (4 lb 7 oz) | 2 kg (4 lb 7 oz) | 2.2 kg (4 lb 14 oz) | 2.1 kg (4 lb 10 oz) |
| Explosive content | 100 g (3.5 oz) | 75 g (2.6 oz) of TNT | 75 g (2.6 oz) of TNT | 75 g (2.6 oz) of TNT |
| Operating pressure | various | 1–15 kg (2–33 lb) | 3 kg (7 lb) pull | 1–15 kg (2–33 lb) pull |
