= MAUS mine =

- Type: Blast mine
- Place of origin: Italy

Production history
- Variants: MAUS/1

Specifications
- Mass: 275 g
- Length: 46 mm
- Diameter: 89 mm
- Effective firing range: 10 m
- Filling: Tetryl
- Filling weight: 16 g
- Detonation mechanism: Pneumatic-pressure fuse

MAUS (Italian: Mina Antiuomo Seminabile) is an Italian designed anti-personnel scatter mine. A plastic high explosive landmine, it is designed for rapid placement on the minefields either by helicopter, hand-drop or other ground vehicle. An integral, safety pin armed, pressure actuated, pneumatic fuse is used which is designed to withstand explosive overpressure for short duration and deployment impact. The mine is also waterproof and can be placed at a depth of one metre. The MAUS and MAUS/1 are identical except the MAUS/1 has an additional plug that either provides access to the expansion bulb or may act as a vent from the diaphragm.
