= Pappmine =

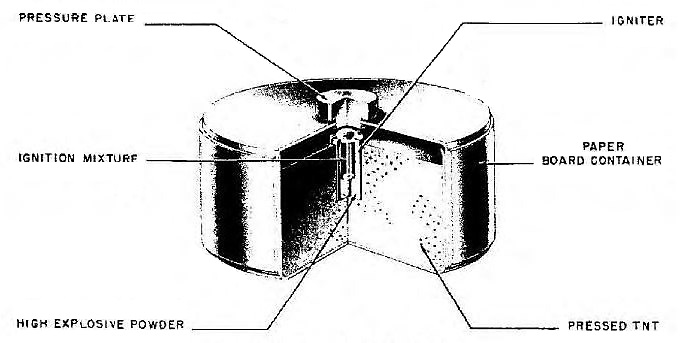
- Type: Anti-tank mine
- Place of origin: Germany

Service history
- In service: 1944-1945
- Used by: Wehrmacht
- Wars: World War II

Specifications
- Mass: 6.67 kg (14.7 lb)
- Height: 13 cm (5 in)
- Diameter: 300 mm (12 in)
- Filling: TNT
- Filling weight: 4.9 kg (11 lb)

The Pappmine, or Cardboard Mine in English, was an anti-tank mine that was developed by Germany and used by the Wehrmacht during World War II.

== Design ==
The Pappmine was designed to be a low cost, and easy to produce cardboard anti-tank mine which could relieve pressure on the overstretched metalworking industry. The Pappmine was made entirely of non-metallic materials to prevent detection by electric mine detectors. The Pappmine was a close copy of the Soviet TMB series of cardboard mines except the Pappmine was better waterproofed to resist moisture and rotting. The Pappmine was black in color and consisted of a container with a lid. The lid covered the full diameter of the container and both the top and bottom edges of the container were rounded and held together by a band of cardboard. In the center of the lid, there was a 70 mm (2.75 in) pressure plate of thick green glass which resembled a glass stopper. In the center of the mine, the pressure plate sat on top of a glass igniter that was embedded in 5 kg (11 lb) of TNT. Only pressure on the plate caused an explosion and pressure on the cardboard side of the mine would not set it off. 340–360 kg (750–790 lb) of pressure on the plate crushed the igniter creating a flash which then passed to the priming charge which exploded the TNT filling. A 3-second delay could also be incorporated in the igniter. The Pappmine relied on blast effect to destroy enemy tanks and it did not have a shaped charge warhead.
