= PPMP-2 mine =

Anti-personnel mine

The PPMP-2 is a Yugoslavian anti-personnel stake mine. The mine was not mass-produced, but was built in large quantities at a number of different locations.

The mine has a grenade-like main body with a diamond grooved fragmentation pattern, although it sometimes uses other patterns. Internally, the mine uses a stick of commercial plastic explosive held centrally by a ring of the same type of explosive at the bottom of the main body. Additional fragmentation material is packed inside the gap between the main charge and the mine body. The mine uses a locally produced fuse similar to the Russian MUV fuse.

The use of commercial explosives as an expedient makes the mine very unstable, as the explosive may deteriorate over time.

The mine is found in Bosnia and Croatia.

== Specifications ==
- Height: 130 mm (without fuze and stake)
- Diameter: 80 mm
- Weight: 2 kg
- Explosive content: 0.2 kg of TNT (explosive) or commercial explosives
- Operating pressure: 2 to 4 kg pull
- Fuze: UPM-1 or UPM-2A
