= No 8 mine =

Anti-tank mine

The No 8 mine is a South African circular plastic cased minimum metal anti-tank blast mine. The mine has a large pressure plate on top of which is an oversize arming lever whose position at either of two sets of lugs either indicates "ARMED" or "SAFE". The mine can be fitted with a number of electronic anti-handling devices as well as seismic and magnetic influence devices. The mine is found in Angola, Namibia, Zambia, and Zimbabwe.

== Specifications ==
- Diameter: 259 mm
- Height: 175 mm
- Weight: 7.4 kg
- Explosive content: 7 kg of a 60/40 RDX/TNT mix.
- Operating pressure: 150 to 220 kg
