= Swedish Model 41 and 47 series mines =

The Model 41-47, Model 47, and Model 47-52 are circular Swedish anti-tank blast mines. The mines are broadly similar, differing only in size and weight.

== Variants ==
- Model 41-47
- Model 47
- Model 47-52B

== Specifications ==
- Diameter: 270 mm
- Height: 125 mm
- Weight: 8 kg (Model 41–47), 9.5 kg (Model 47)
- Explosive content: 5 kg of TNT
- Operating pressure: 200 to 400 kg
