= NR 25 mine =

The NR 25 is a circular Dutch steel cased anti-tank blast mine. It is broadly similar in appearance to the German Tellermine 43, although it is larger. The mine has a central domed pressure plate, underneath which is an NR-29 mechanical pressure fuze, which is inserted into a fuze well. A doughnut-shaped main charge surrounds a central booster charge. Two secondary fuze wells are provided on the side and base of the mine, for anti-handling devices.

The mine is in service with the Royal Netherlands Army and is found in Lebanon.

== Specifications ==
- Diameter: 305 mm
- Height: 128 mm
- Weight: 12.97 kg
- Explosive content: 9 kg of TNT
- Operating pressure: 250 to 350 kg
- Adaptability: even better than Adaptive user interfaces
