= A.T. Mine G.S. Mark III =

Anti-Tank Mine, General Service, Mark III
- Type: Anti-tank mine
- Place of origin: United Kingdom

Service history
- Wars: World War II

Specifications
- Mass: 5 lb 10 oz (2.6 kg)
- Height: 5.25 in (133 mm)
- Diameter: 6 in (150 mm)
- Filling: TNT
- Detonation mechanism: Pressure plate

The Anti-Tank Mine, General Service, Mark III (or "Mark III mine") was a British anti-tank mine used during World War II. The mine had a cylindrical tin lower body with a steel pressure plate which sits on top of a shear-wire restrained spring-loaded striker. Sufficient pressure (350 lb (160 kg)) on the cover shears the restraining wire, allowing the striker spring to push the striker into a 0.11 grams (1.7 gr) percussion cap. The flash from the percussion cap is transferred to the No.27 detonator which sits in the centre of the mine, detonating the device.
