= TM-89 mine =

Russian anti-tank mine

The TM-89 is a Russian anti-tank mine first publicly shown in 1993. The mine uses a Misznay Schardin effect warhead capable of penetrating 200 mm of armour at a stand-off distance of 0.45 m. The mine is fitted with a two-channel magnetic influence fuze, and can be laid from the GMZ-3 mine layer or by the VMR-2 helicopter mine layer.

== Specifications ==
- Weight: 11.5 kg
- Diameter: 320 mm
- Height: 132 mm
- Explosive content: 6.7 kg of TG-40/60
- Armour penetration: 200 mm at a stand-off of 0.45 m
- Operational life: 30 days
- Operating temperature: −30 to +50 °C

== See also ==
- Anti-tank mine
- Land mine

== Sources ==
- Jane's Mines and Mine Clearance 2005–2006.
