= NR-413 =

Anti-personnel mine

The NR-413 is a Belgian trip wire activated anti-personnel stake mine. The main body of the mine is wine bottle shaped, with an NR 410 tripwire fuse screwed into a fuse well on the top of the mine. Under the fuse well is a detonator and a row of booster pellets. Wrapped around the detonator and booster pellets is the main charge. An internally square cross-sectioned steel wire is coiled around the outside of the mine, which give a fragmentation effect. The mine produces 600 fragments with a velocity of approximately 1,660 metres per second. It has an effective range of around 15 metres. A variant is produced with a cast steel fragmentation jacket.

The mine is normally mounted on a metal stake.

The four wires protrude from the top of the NR 410 fuse, each of which has a ring attached for fixing to tripwires. A safety pin protrudes preventing the mine being triggered while it is handled. Once the mine is armed pull pressure on any of the wires raises a central collar inside the fuse releasing a small retaining ball, allowing the striker to detonate the mine.

The mine is found in Chad, Lebanon, Rwanda, Somalia, Uganda, the Western Sahara.

A copy of the mine is produced in Portugal as the M421.

== Specifications ==
- Diameter: 46 mm
- Height: 114 mm (230 mm on stake)
- Weight: 640 g
- Explosive content: 100 g of Composition B
