= MGP-31 mine =

The MGP-31 is a scatterable Peruvian circular, plastic cased minimum metal blast resistant anti-tank blast mine. The mine has a central domed pressure plate, and a ribbed edge. It will function upside down. Little is known about the mine, and it is believed to be in service with the Peruvian armed forces.

== Specifications ==
- Diameter: 320 mm
- Height: 130 mm
