= Cardoen AT mine =

Anti-tank mine

The Cardoen AT mine is a circular steel cased Chilean anti-tank blast mine that was produced by Industrias Cardoen SA. The mine is conventional in design with a central pressure plate held between three flexible tabs, underneath the pressure plate is a simple mechanical detonator. The mine has a secondary fuze well for the fitting of anti-handling devices. The mine was in service with the Chilean armed services, but is now obsolete.

== Specifications ==
- Diameter: 380 mm
- Height: 150 mm
- Weight: 14 kg
- Explosive content: 9.5 kg of Pentolite with Mexal 1500
