= Pignone anti-tank mines =

Pignone mod.43
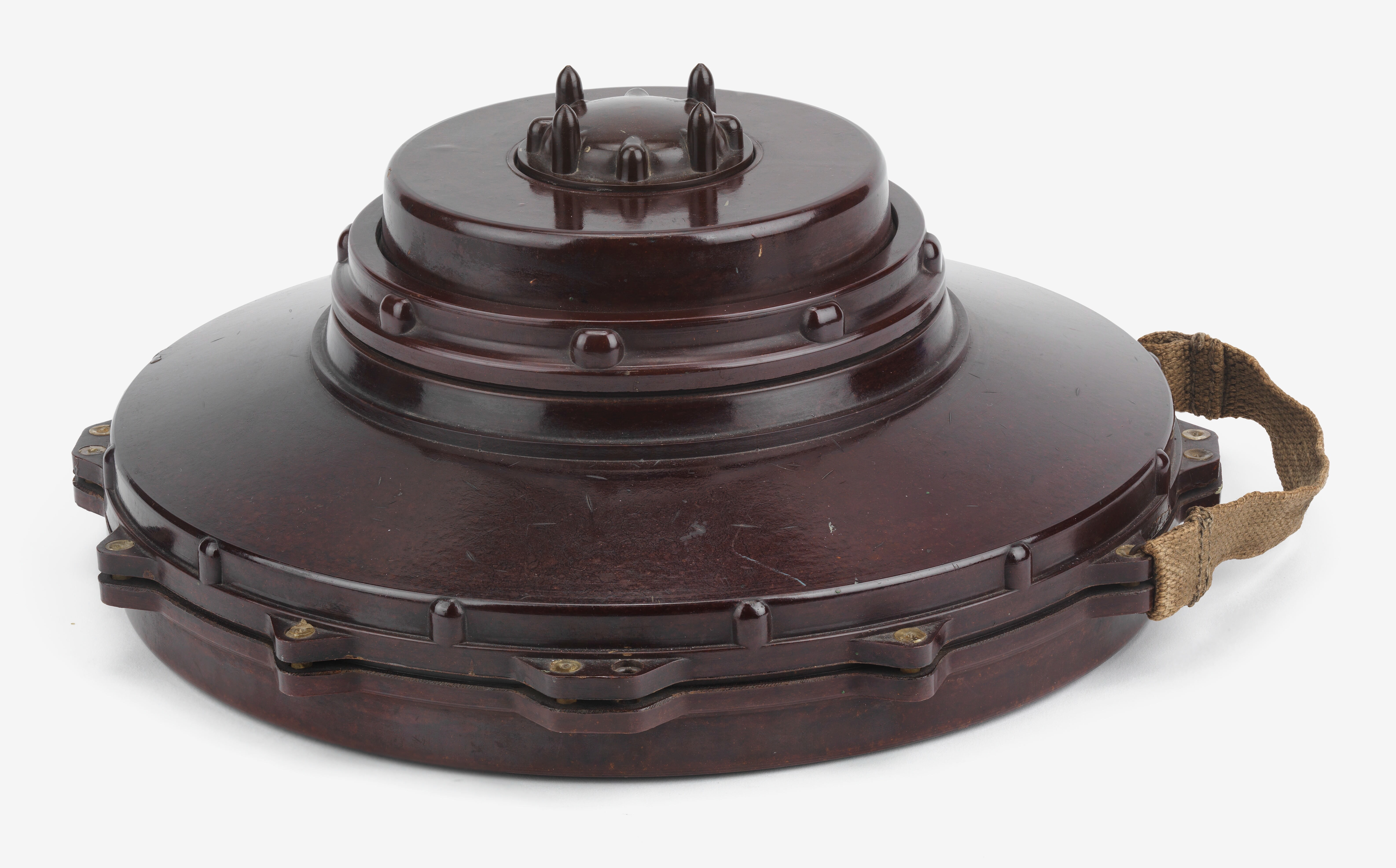
- Pignone mod.43 type 2 conserved at the Imperial War Museums
- Type: anti-tank mine
- Place of origin: Kingdom of Italy

Service history
- In service: 1943-1945
- Used by: Royal italian Army
- Wars: World War II

Production history
- Variants: Type 1 and Type 2

Specifications
- Mass: 7.3 kilograms (16 lb)
- Height: 145 millimetres (5.7 in)
- Diameter: 370 millimetres (15 in)
- Filling: TNT
- Filling weight: 5 kilograms (11 lb)
- Detonation mechanism: Pressure activated (136 kilograms (300 lb) of pressure)

The Pignone mod.43 were bakelite-cased Italian anti-tank blast mines used during the Second World War in North Africa and Italy.

== History ==
The Pignone mines were the most modern Italian anti-tank mines of WWII, they were produced starting from 1943 in two versions: type 1 and type 2, which differed by the external shaping and the activating pressure which was respectively 50 kilograms (110 lb) and 136 kilograms (300 lb). Although the mines had plastic cases, they had a number of metal components, rendering them detectable to mine detectors.

== Post WW2 Development ==
The Pignone P-1 and Pignone P-2 were plastic cased Italian anti-tank blast mines.

The P-1 has circular plate like body 33.5 centimeters in diameter and 14 centimeters high with a central raised pressure plate. The P-1 uses a 7.0 kilograms (15.4 lb) main charge of TNT.

The P-2 has a circular bowl like body 33 centimeters in diameter and 12.7 centimeters high. It uses a smaller 5.0 kilograms (11 lb) TNT charge.

Pressure of between 110 and 150 kilograms (242 and 330 lb) on the pressure plate of either of the mines compresses a rubber collar, pushing down the head of the fuze. The downward movement of the fuze ruptures the shear pins freeing the head of the fuze. The fuze head continues downwards, compressing a rubber cylinder which presses down on the striker assembly until two retaining balls are released. The striker is then pushed by a spring into a percussion cap which triggers a booster followed by the main charge.

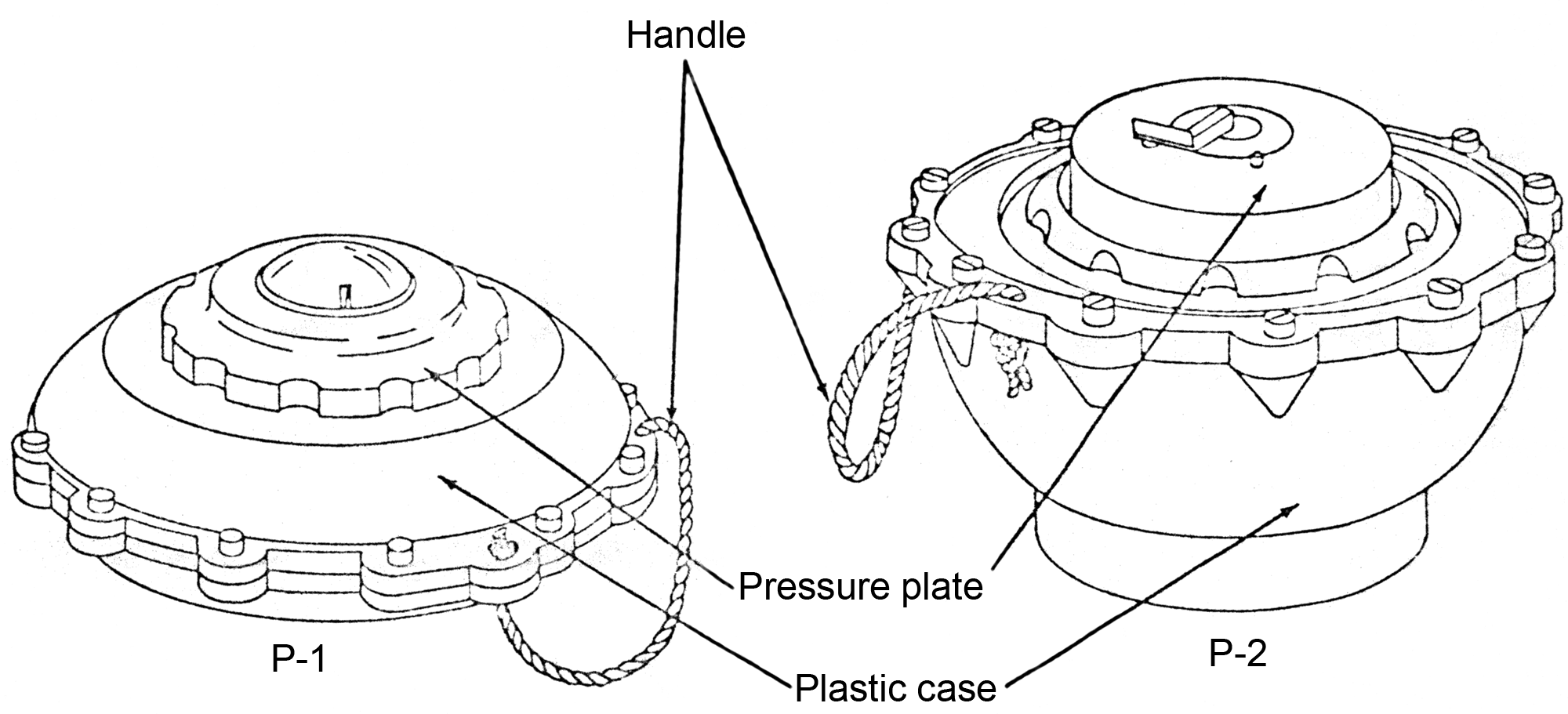
Diagrams of the P-1 and P-2 mines (not to scale).
