= PMR-U mine =

Yugoslavian anti-personnel stake mine

The PMR-U is a Yugoslavian anti-personnel stake mine. The mine was apparently not mass-produced, but built in small numbers at a number of different locations.

The mine has a small plastic main body with a large seam in the middle. Internally the mine has a 100-gram (3.5 oz) main charge around which a mixture of Plaster of Paris and steel fragments is poured to form a fragmentation liner. The mine uses a number of different commercial explosives, with the result that the mine becomes unstable over time.

The mine is found in Bosnia and Croatia.

== Specifications ==
- Height: 100 mm (3.9 in) (without fuse and stake)
- Diameter: 75 mm (3.0 in)
- Explosive content: 0.1 kg (0.22 lb) of commercial explosives
- Operating pressure: 2 to 5 kg (4.4 to 11.0 lb) pull
- Fuze: UPM-1 or UPMR-2A
