= PT Mi-K mine =

Anti-tank mine

The PT Mi-K is a Czechoslovak metal-cased anti-tank blast landmine. The mine uses a metal grid instead a pressure plate, this gives it resistance to overpressure. The mine is no longer produced, but is found in Afghanistan, Cambodia, Eritrea, Namibia, Nicaragua and the Western Sahara.

== Description ==
The mine has a circular metal case inside which is the doughnut shaped main charge, in the centre of which the fuse is inserted. On top of the mine is a metal pressure grid. The grid is held in place by a thin metal wall. Sufficient pressure on the grid causes the wall to collapse sideways, allowing the grid to press down on a plunger triggering a 3.5 oz (0.1 kg) Toul (Tetryl) booster charge, detonating the mine.

The mine can be fitted with two main fuzes, the RO-5 and the RO-9 fuse. The RO-5 fuse may be fitted with an RO-3 anti-lifting device, which will trigger the mine if it is raised.

== Specifications ==
- Weight: 7.2 kg
- Explosive content: 5 kg of TNT
- Diameter: 300 mm
- Height: 102 mm
- Activation pressure: 330 kg
