= TMK-2 mine =

Anti-tank mine

The TMK-2 is a Soviet steel cased anti-tank mine. It uses a tilt-rod fuze combined with a shaped charge to attack the belly of vehicles as they pass over the mine. It was originally designed in 1955, but is now obsolete. The mine consists of a case shaped like two truncated cones joined at the base. The MVK-2 tilt rod assembly is held to one side of the mine. The lower truncated cone contains the main charge, and dished metal charge liner.

When a vehicle passes over the mine, the tilt rod is bent by 24 to 36 degrees, which allows retaining balls holding the striker to escape, which is driven by a spring into the MD-7M detonator. This then ignites a detonator cord, which carries the detonation wave into the main body of the mine and the DUM-2 detonator, fixed at the bottom of the main charge. The main charge is triggered, and the blast wave travels around a wave shaper, which improves the efficiency of the shaped charge.

The resulting blast can penetrate between 60 and 110 millimeters of around depending on if the slightly less powerful TNT, or the more powerful TG-50 explosive is used.

It is found in Afghanistan, Angola, Azerbaijan, Eritrea, Ethiopia, Iraq, Mozambique and Namibia.

== Specifications ==
- Diameter: 307 mm
- Height: 265 mm (1.13 m with tilt rod fuze)
- Weight: 12.5 kg
- Explosive content: 6.5 or 6 kg of TG-50 or TNT
- Operating pressure: 8 to 12 kg tilt
