= A.T. Mine G.S. Mark IV =

The Anti-Tank Mine, General Service, Mark IV (or Mk 4 mine) was a British anti-tank mine used during World War II. Externally the mine has a cylindrical main body filled with explosive either TNT or Baratol. The mine is covered by a pressure plate, which is attached to the mine body by four pins which sit in vertical slots in clips that fold up from the bottom of the mine. The mine uses the Shear-pin based Contact Mine Fuze No.3 Mk I. The fuze consists simply of a spring-loaded striker pin restrained by a shear pin. Sufficient pressure on the pressure plate presses the plate down on the head of the fuze, breaking the shear wire and releasing the striker, which is driven into the detonator by the striker spring.

== Specifications ==
- Diameter: 8 inches
- Height: 5 inches
- Weight: 8.25 lbs
- Explosive content: TNT or Baratol
- Operating pressure: 350 lbs
