= VS-AT4 mine =

Italian anti-tank mine

The VS-AT4 and VS-AT4-EL are Italian minimum metal blast resistant anti-tank blast mines. The VS-AT4 uses a blast-resistant mechanical pressure fuze. In contrast, the VS-AT4-EL uses a programmable electronic pressure fuze with an integral anti-lifting function.

The electronic fuze in the VS-AT4 has an active life of between one hour and one year, which can be set in one-hour increments, at the end of which the mine will either self-destruct or disarm itself.

== Specifications ==
- Length: 280 mm
- Width: 104 mm
- Height: 188 mm
- Weight: 6 kg approx
- Explosive content: 4.5 kg of Composition B
