= T-IV mine =

Soviet anti-tank mine

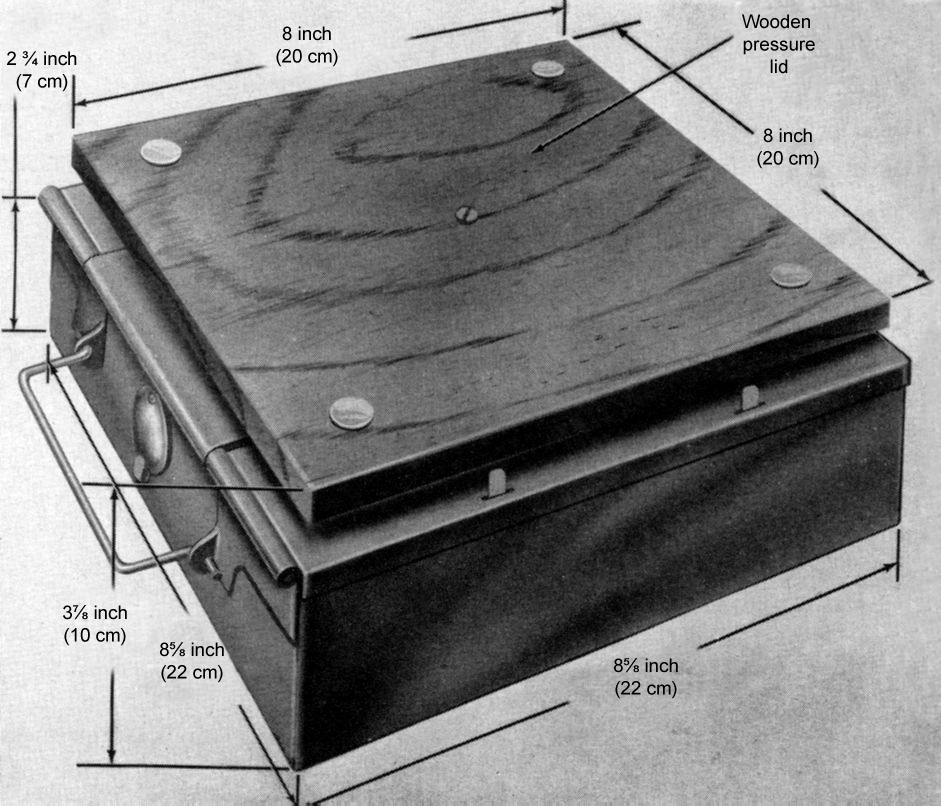
A US picture of the T-IV including dimensions.

The T-IV was a Soviet anti-tank mine developed before and used during the Second World War. The mine has a metal case with a wooden pressure plate attached to the top of the mine. It is similar in configuration to the later TM-38.

The mine uses an MUV pull fuze attached to an internal lever fuze. Pressure on the lid depresses one end of the lever, removing the striker retaining pin from the MUV fuze, allowing the striker to impact a percussion cap, which ignites the detonator followed by the main charge.

== Specifications ==
- Length: 210 mm
- Weight: 4.3 kg
- Explosive content: 2.8 kg of TNT
