= Type 9 wooden anti-tank mine =

Italian anti-tank mine

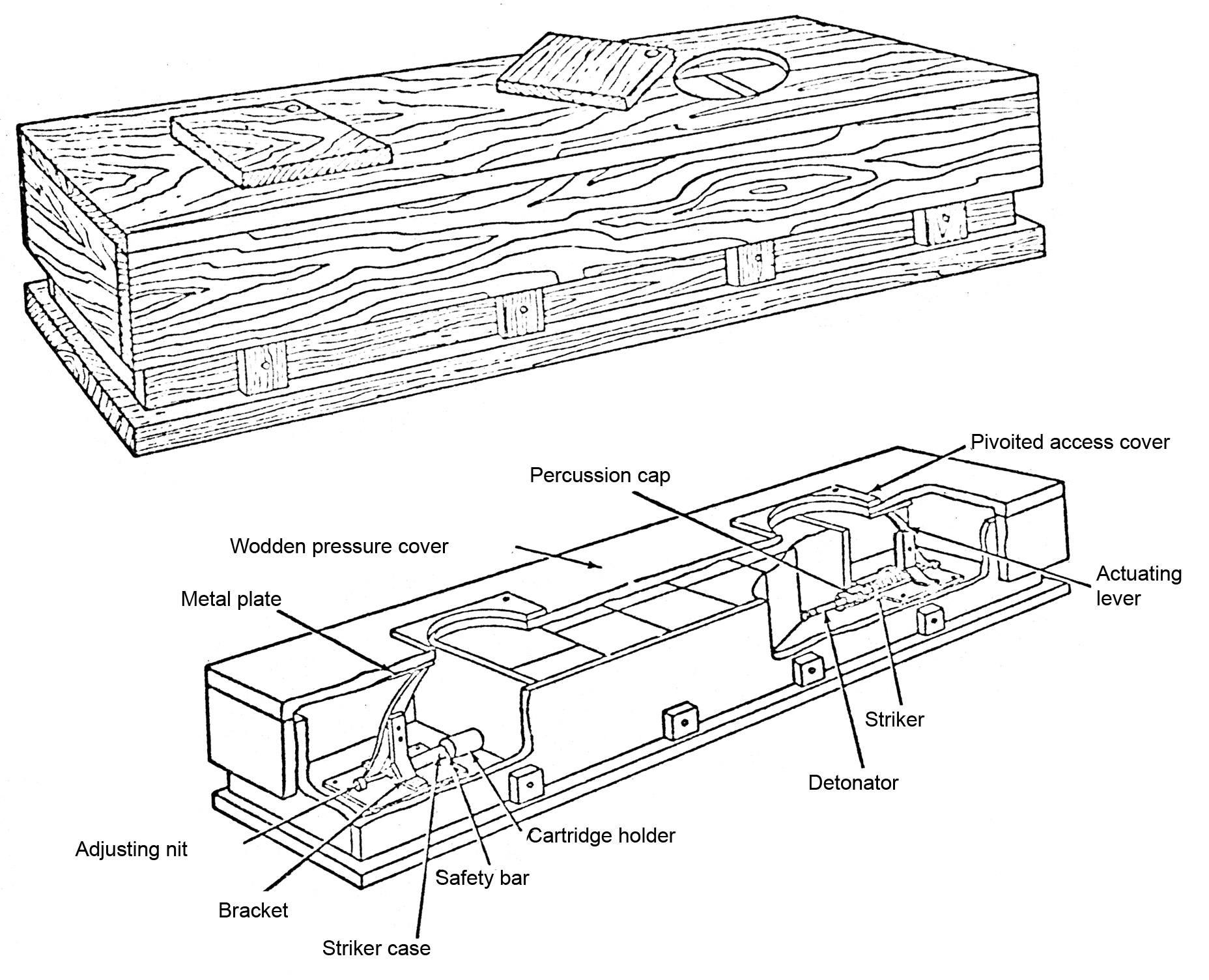
A drawing of the mine.

The Type 9 wooden anti-tank mine was an Italian bar type anti-tank mine used during World War II in North Africa. The box consisted of a lower section, containing the large warhead and fuzes and an upper, overlapping lid with two pivoting wooden covers that sat over the two fuzes. The fuzes were designed as a pivoting lever, and downward motion of the lid caused the lever to pull back a striker, compressing a striker spring until the pivoting action moved the lever enough to release the striker. The striker then impacted a blank cartridge, firing it, triggering a detonator charge, followed by the main charge.

Used primarily at junctions and road-blocks, because of the width of coverage it provided, the mine sensitivity could be adjusted between approximately 20 pounds of triggering pressure to 500 pounds by inserting small wooden blocks under the rim of the lid.

== Specifications ==
- Length: 99 cm
- Width: 22.8 cm
- Height: 13.3 cm
