= MI AC Disp F1 Minotaur mine =

Anti-tank mine

The MI AC Disp F1 Minotaur mine is a French scatterable anti-tank mine. The mines can also be scattered from 155 millimetre artillery shells, which can hold six of the mines. The mine is cylindrical with two Misznay Schardin effect warheads, one on each side of the mine, with a 600 gram charge. The warhead is claimed to be able to penetrate 90 mm of armour at a distance of 0.5 m. It uses a magnetic influence fuze combined with an anti-handling device which arms itself 64 seconds after launch. At the end of its active life, which is set to between one and 96 hours the mine self-destructs. The land based scattering system can launch mines to a range of up to 300 m.

The mine is sensitive to disturbance, and possibly to the signals generated by mine detectors, recent modifications to the mine have reported desensitised it. However it still features a motion sensitive anti-handling device.

== Specifications ==
- Diameter: 139 mm
- Weight: 2.25 kg
- Explosive content: 2 × 600 g explosive charges
