= KhF-1 and KhF-2 bounding gas mines =

Soviet landmines developed during World War II

The KhF-1 and KhF-2 bounding gas mines were Soviet landmines developed during World War II, though they were not deployed during the conflict. The mines would be triggered by an operator several hundred meters away, whereupon the mine bounded into the air and shattered projecting a chemical gas over an area of between 250 and 300 square meters.

== Specifications ==
- Length: 345 mm
- Diameter: 150 mm
- Weight: 15 kg
- Warhead: 4.5 liter chemical
