= BPM-1 =

Argentine anti-personnel device, first produced in 1978

BPM-1 is a plastic cased Argentinian anti-personnel stake mine. It was developed late 1970s and entered production in 1978. BPM-1 was used in the Falklands War 1982.

== Description ==
The mine consists of a plastic cylinder with a fuse protruding from the top. The mine can either be stake mounted or buried. Pull pressure on the tripwire results in the fuse head tilting sideways, releasing a striker into the detonator assembly.

The mine has a steel fragmentation liner, which when it detonates scatters fragments to an effective radius of 10 meters.

== Specifications ==
- Height: 172 mm (with fuse)
- Diameter: 70 mm
- Weight: 0.65 kg
- Explosive content: 0.18 kg
- Operating pressure: 2 to 10 kg
