= MBV-78-A2 mine =

Vietnamese stake mine

The MBV-78-A2 is a small cylindrical Vietnamese anti-personnel fragmentation stake mine. It is unrelated to the MBV-78-A1. The mine has a large plastic head which contains the main charge wrapped around the detonator. A fragmentation layer of steel pieces set into wax surrounds the main charge. The plastic head has two mounting lugs for stake mounting the mine. A Vietnamese copy of the Russian MUV fuze is typically used with the mine, although other fuzes could be used.

The mine is normally tripwire triggered, with the tripwire pulling a safety pin out of the fuze, releasing a striker to hit a stab sensitive detonator. The mine is reported to be lethal to a radius in excess of 30 meters, although it is more typically lethal to a radius of 10 meters.

The mine is found in Vietnam and Cambodia.

== Specifications ==
- Height: 80 mm (excluding fuze) 130 mm (including fuze)
- Diameter: 53 mm
- Weight: 0.15 kg
- Explosive content: 0.065 kg of TNT
- Operating pressure: 2 to 5 kg pull
