= P-40 APPLE mine =

The P-40 mine is a Vietnamese anti-personnel fragmentation stake mine. The mines were produced using the spherical steel cases of United States BLU-24/B and BLU-66 submunitions on top of which is a plastic adaptor to accept an MUV style tripwire fuze.

The spherical steel case is grooved to aid fragmentation, with the grooves either being internal or external depending on the variant of submunition used as the basis of the mine. The mine is normally mounted on a small three pronged stake and has an effective radius of around 10 meters.

The mine is found in Cambodia and Vietnam.

== Specifications ==
- Diameter: 70 mm
- Height: 104 mm
- Weight: 0.614 kg
- Explosive content: 0.12 kg of TNT
