= Italian Bakelite Anti-tank mines =

The Bakelite anti-tank mine type I and type II were Italian anti-tank mines produced during the Second World War. As the name suggests, the mines used Bakelite cases and used relatively few metal components, making them difficult to detect with mine detectors of the era. It was primarily used to deter pursuit when withdrawing from an area.

The Type I mine had a cylindrical case with a domed upper pressure plate that is held above the main case of the mine by the spring-loaded central fuze well. A strip of canvas around the circumference seals the gap between the pressure plate and the main body of the mine. The Type II uses a smaller pressure plate, that does not cover the entire top surface of the mine, giving the center of the mine a raised appearance. In every other detail, the mines are identical.

Both mines were armed and disarmed using a brass arming key.

The mine is triggered by downward force of greater than 110 pounds on the pressure plate, which pushes the upper fuze assembly downwards. This compresses nine coil springs and shears two brass shear pins. As the pressure continues, striker retaining balls line up with cavities that allow them to escape, releasing the striker into the percussion cap detonator, this triggers the booster charge, followed by the main charge.

== Specifications ==
	Type I	Type II
Diameter	295 mm (11.6 in)	299 mm (11.8 in)
Height	130 mm (5.1 in)	139 mm (5.5 in)
Operating force	110 lbf (490 N)	300 lbf (1,330 N)
Explosive content	8 lb (3.6 kg)	8 lb (3.6 kg)
