= FFV 018 mine =

Anti-tank mine

The FFV 018 is a Swedish off-route anti-tank mine. It uses a large Misznay Schardin effect warhead, that generates a fast moving slug capable of penetrating the side armour of a tank. The mine is mounted on a squat tripod, and houses a built- in infra-red sensor package, which detects the target and triggers the mine when the target is in the optimal position.

== Specifications ==
- Weight: 15 kg (approx)

== See also ==
- FFV 016 mine
