= M61 and M63 stake mines =

Anti-personnel mines

The M61 or Model 61 and M63 or Model 63 are French anti-personnel stake fragmentation stake mines the mines are sometimes called piquet (picket). The M61 is slightly larger than the M63, but otherwise the mines are similar in appearance and operation. The mines have plastic cases, and use the ALPR ID 59 fuze, which is also used in the MI AP DV 59 mine, it can also be fitted with a tripwire fuze. The mines can be fitted with a plastic detonator making the mine very difficult to detect.

The M63 has an anti-lifting device, attempting to pull the mine out of the ground will result in pressure on the stakes prongs, triggering the mine.

The mine has not been produced since 1982 and France has destroyed all operational stocks of this mine.

== Specifications ==
| | Model 61 | Model 63 |
|---|---|---|
| Diameter | 35 mm | |
| Height | 270 mm | |
| Weight | 125 g | 100 g |
| Explosive content | 57 g of TNT | 30 g of Tetryl |
| Operating pressure | 18 kg | |
