= TMM-1 mine =

Anti-tank landmine

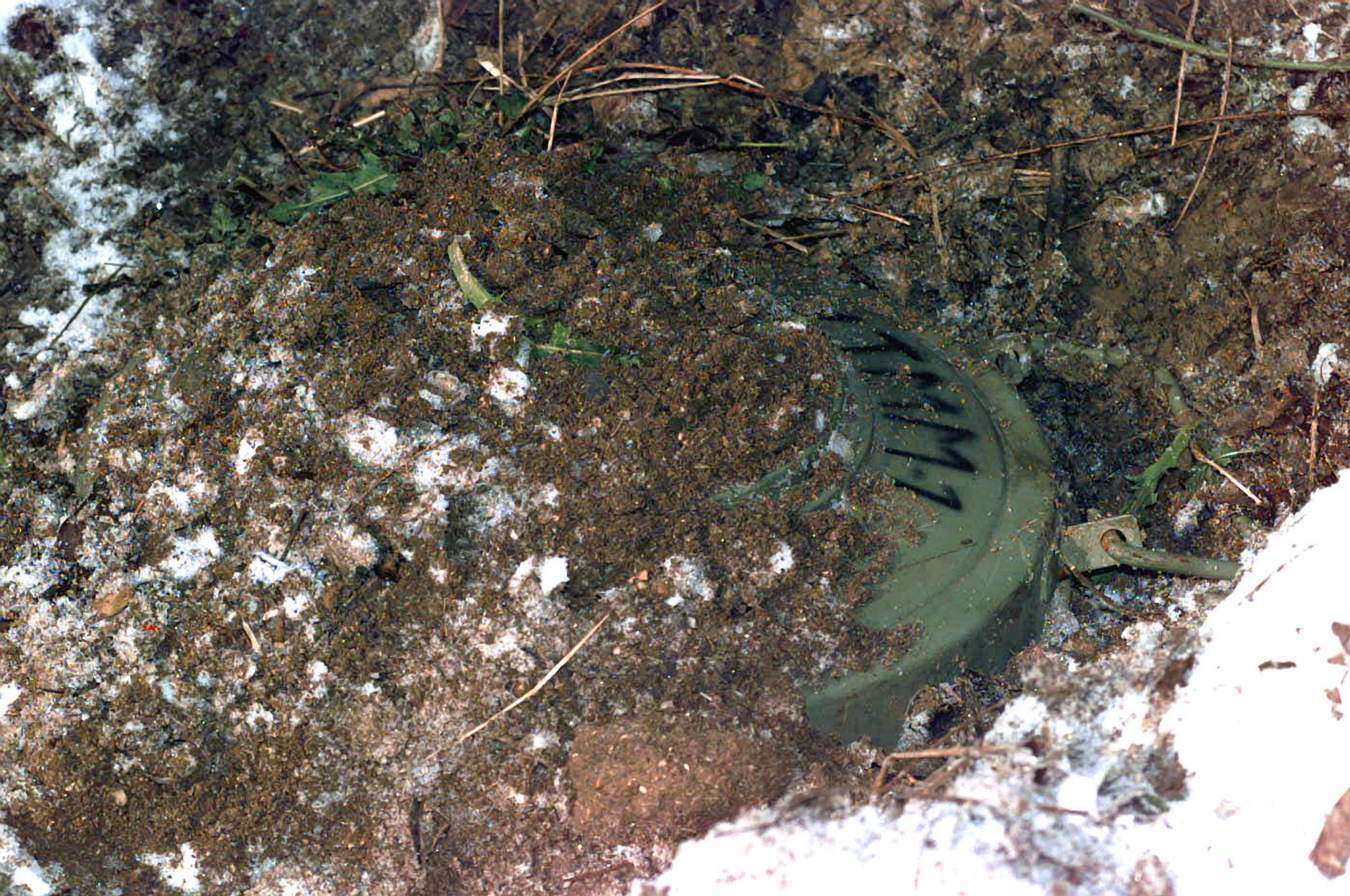
TMM-1

The TMM-1 is a circular, metal-cased, Yugoslavian anti-tank blast mine. It is a direct copy of the German Tellermine 43. The mine has a central fuze well that is covered by a screw on pressure plate. Two secondary fuze well are fitted to the side and bottom of the mine allowing the installation of anti-handling devices. The mine is found in Bosnia, Croatia, and Serbia.

== Specifications ==
- Diameter: 300 mm
- Height: 90 mm
- Weight: 8.6 kg
- Explosive content: 5.6 kg of TNT
- Operating pressure: 130 to 420 kg
