= MAT.84-F5 mine =

Anti-tank mine

The MAT.84-F5 is a Chilean, plastic cased, minimum metal anti-tank blast mine. The mine has a small central pressure plate on the top of the case which is made from 3 mm thick, olive green, high-impact plastic. The mine is armed before it is laid by unscrewing a safety plug from the side of the mine. The mine is believed to be in service with the Chilean armed services.

== Specifications ==
- Diameter: 300 mm (approx)
- Height: 120 mm (approx)
- Weight: 10.3 kg
- Explosive content: 9.3 kg of pentolite
