= P-25 mine =

Plastic cased Italian anti-personnel stake mine

The P-25 is a plastic cased Italian anti-personnel stake mine. It was developed along with the larger P-40 mine in the late 1970s by Misar SpA and entered production in 1978. The mine consists of a plastic cylinder with a fuse protruding from the top. The mine can either be stake mounted or buried, although it was designed to be stake mounted. Pull pressure on the tripwire results in the fuse head tilting sideways, releasing a striker into the detonator assembly.

The mine has a steel fragmentation liner, which when it detonates scatters fragments to an effective radius of 15 meters.

The mine has been sold to Iraq (1980), Iran (1984) and to Australia, to whom, in 1986, the production technology was licensed. Production of the mine has ceased, and all Italian operational stocks of the mine have been destroyed.

== Specifications ==
- Height: 180 mm (with fuse)
- Diameter: 75 mm
- Weight: 0.68 kg
- Explosive content: 0.18 kg of TNT and T4 (RDX)
- Operating pressure: 2 to 10 kg
