= PP-Mi-Sr mine =

Czechoslovak bounding mine

The PP-Mi-Sr is a Czechoslovak bounding mine, broadly similar to the German S-mine. It uses either a three pronged RO-8 fuze or a RO-1 pull fuze.

It has an NEQ of 360g, and it activated by 3-6kg of pressure.

The mine was extensively exported and is found in Afghanistan, Angola, Cambodia, Costa Rica, Eritrea, Ethiopia, Lebanon, Mozambique, Namibia, Nicaragua, Somalia, Yemen and Zambia.
