= PMR-3 mine =

Yugoslavian anti-personnel stake mine

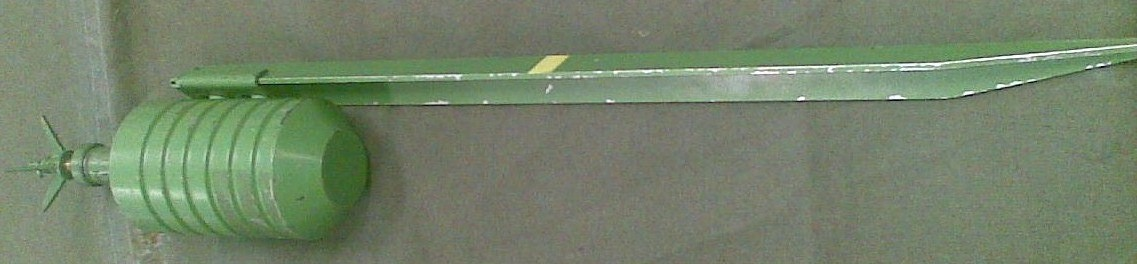

The PMR-3 is a Yugoslavian anti-personnel stake mine. The mine is a development of the PMR-1 and PMR-2 stake mines, having a larger main charge and a greater effective radius. Two versions of the mine were built, an 'old' version and a 'new' version. The principal difference being that the 'old' model could be pressure and pull operated, while the 'new' model can only be pull operated.

The 'old' version consists of a cylindrical main body with six large fragmentation grooves running around the circumference and two mounting lugs on one side for mounting the mine to a provided metal stake. The 'new' version of the mine is similar, but with a smaller fuze and no fragmentation grooves.

The 'old' model of the mine is found in Bosnia, Chile, Croatia, and Kosovo. The 'new' model is found in Bosnia and Croatia.

== Specifications ==
| | PMR-3 (old) | PMR-3 (new) |
|---|---|---|
| Height (main body) | 134 mm | 128 mm |
| Diameter | 78 mm | 77 mm |
| Weight | 2 kg | |
| Explosive content | 0.41 kg of TNT | 0.41 kg of plastic explosive |
| Operating pressure | 9 kgf pressure 3 kgf pull | 2 to 7 kgf pull |
| Fuzes | UPMR-3 or UPROM-1 | UMNP-1 variant |
