= Type 2 AT mine =

The Type 2, T40 mine is a Dutch anti-tank blast mine, specially designed for use on soft ground or wetlands. The mine has a steel case made from two dished plates joined by a watertight seal. The mine is in service with the Royal Netherlands Army.

== Specifications ==
- Diameter: 280 mm
- Height: 90 mm
- Weight: 6 kg
- Explosive content: 4.08 kg of TNT
- Operating pressure: 45 kg
