= PT Mi-U mine =

Czech anti-tank mine

The PT Mi-U is a circular Czech anti-tank mine with a Misznay Schardin effect warhead. It can be used with a conventional pressure fuze or a tilt rod fuze.

The mine can be used with an electronic fuze with an adjustable electronic arming delay, self neutralization period, and self-destruct period.

== Specifications ==
- Diameter: 317 mm
- Height: 120 mm
- Weight: 9.41 kg
- Explosive content: 7.11 kg of TNT
- Operating pressure: tilt rod or pressure
