= M/71 mine =

The M/71 is a large Egyptian metal-cased anti-tank blast mine based on the Russian TM-46 landmine. It is found in Egypt and Somalia. The mine is normally painted sand colored. The fuse is susceptible to overpressure and the mine is easily detectable.

== Specifications ==
- Weight: 9.8 kilograms (22 lb)
- Explosive content: 6.25 kilograms (13.8 lb) of TNT
- Diameter: 315 millimetres (12.4 in)
- Height: 100 millimetres (3.9 in)
- Operating pressure: 150 to 300 kilograms (330 to 660 lb)
