= Na-Mi-Ba mine =

Czechoslovak minimum metal bakelite cased anti-tank blast mine

The Na-Mi-Ba is a Czechoslovak minimum metal bakelite cased anti-tank blast mine. The mine uses a horizontal lever fuze, with a very low operating pressure that breaks open a glass capsule containing acid, which initiates a flash composition. The mine has a small main charge, and is normally used as the initiator for larger charges. The low operating pressure means that the mine could be used as an anti-personnel mine.

== Specifications ==
- Diameter: 200 mm
- Height: 250 mm
- Explosive content: 2.2 kg of TNT
- Operating pressure: 2.2 kg
