= Type 96 mine =

Land mine

The Type 96 mine is a Japanese large hemispherical landmine used during the Second World War. It entered service in 1936. The mine could be deployed in shallow water or on land, and used two lead alloy horn fuzes. The horns contained a glass vial filled with an electrolytic fluid, that when released triggered the electrical fuze detonating the mine.

== Specifications ==
- Height: 10.5 inches (0.27 m)
- Diameter: 20 inches (0.5 m)
- Weight: 107 lbs (48.5 kg)
- Explosive content: 46 lbs (21 kg)
