= PT Mi-Ba mine =

Anti-tank mine

The PT Mi-Ba (also known as the PT Mi-Ba-53) is a circular Bakelite cased Czechoslovak minimum metal anti-tank blast mine. The mine entered service with the Czech and Slovak armies in the 1950s and is now obsolete and no longer in service. The mine is conventional in layout with a central pressure plate, and doughnut-shaped main charge around a booster charge. It can use either an RO-7-1, pressure-actuated RO-7-II or a pressure-actuated/anti-removal RO-7-III fuze. The mine's fuze is the only component that contains any metal, and this is limited to a spring, the striker pin, and the detonator capsule.

== Specifications ==
- Diameter: 324 mm
- Height: 115 mm
- Weight: 7.83 kg
- Explosive content: 6 kg of TNT with a 0.208 kg booster charge
- Operating pressure: 200 to 400 kg
