= SAPM mine =

The SAPM (Scatterable Anti-Personnel Fragmentation Mine) is a Chinese scatterable anti-personnel fragmentation mine. It is typically deployed from either 122 mm rockets or truck based mine layers. Once the mine hits the ground, two tripwires are deployed to a maximum distance of 10 meters from the mine. Tension on these wires triggers the mine.

== Specifications ==
- Height: 97 mm
- Diameter: 52 mm
- Weight: 0.58 kg
- Explosive content: 0.052 kg of phlegmatized RDX
- Operating pressure: 0.1 to 0.4 kg pull
