= ATM-6 and ATM-7 mines =

The ATM-6 and ATM-7 are Austrian off-route anti-tank mines that use Misznay Schardin effect warheads to fire self forging fragments into the sides of armoured vehicles. Both mines are mounted on a pedestal base which is used to aim the mine, and have simple sights to aim the mines. The mines originally could be triggered by a variety of means, including contact wire and infra-red fuses, however as a result of Austrian laws, they now only use command detonation.

The ATM-7 is a slightly larger and more powerful mine, capable of projecting a fragment that can penetrate 70 mm of armour at 80 m range, producing a hole approximately 120 mm in diameter.

== Specifications ==
	ATM-6	ATM-7
Length	180 mm	
Diameter	320 mm	
Weight	13 kg	14 kg
Explosive content	7.2 kg of Composition B	9 kg of Composition B
