= M1936 mine =

Anti-tank mine

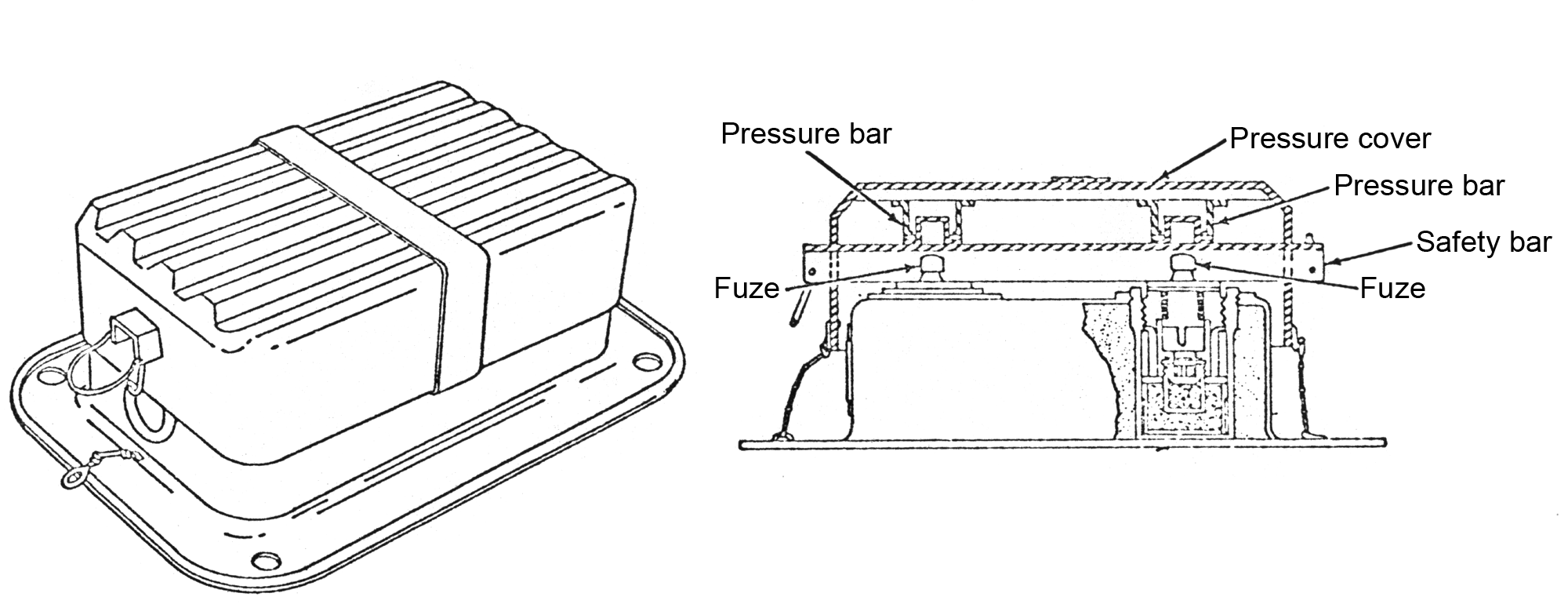
A diagram of a model 1936 mine.

The M1936 (Mle1936) is a French light anti-tank mine used during the Second World War. The mine was captured in large numbers by the German army after the Fall of France, and was later used in the Atlantikwall, North Africa and Italy. The mine consists of a base plate on top of which is a rectangular steel box containing an explosive charge. On top of the container are two M1935 or M1936 pressure fuzes. A pressure cover is fixed on top of the container by wires attached at either end of the container. Two pressure bars are welded to the inside of the pressure cover, each one is directly over a fuze—however, each bar has a recess preventing it from pressing on the pressure fuze, until a safety bar is inserted. The safety bar covers the recesses allowing the pressure cover to bear down directly on the pressure fuzes.

The base plate of the mine has four holes for hold down bolts when used in a fixed position.

== Specifications ==
- Length: 240 millimetres (9.5 in)
- Width: 140 millimetres (5.5 in)
- Weight: 6.6 kilograms (14.5 pounds)
- Explosive content: 2.6 kilograms (5 3/4 lb) of TNT
- Operating pressure: 140 to 230 kilograms-force (300 to 500 lbf)
