= Type 3 mine =

Land mine

The Type 3 mine was a Japanese ceramic cased landmine used during the Second World War. The mine contained approximately 3 kg of explosive and had a diameter of 27 cm. A wooden landmine using the same fuse was also produced towards the end of the war.
