= Model 123 mine =

The Model 123 is a small Thai Claymore style directional anti-personnel mine. The mine has a square plastic main body with a convex front face marked with a triangle which is supported by two sets of scissor legs. Inside the main body is a layer of four hundred 5.5 millimeter steel ball bearings embedded in an RDX type explosive. The mine is normally used with an electrical detonator which is inserted into the top of the mine.

An electrical firing device which is encased in an identical plastic case to the mine is normally used to trigger the detonator. The firing device has a pair of red and black terminals on one end for connecting the wire from the detonator. A three position switch on the front face of the case is used to trigger the mine by moving the switch from safe, through test to fire.

On detonation the mine scatters the ball bearings in a 60° horizontal arc out to an effective range of approximately 30 meters, however some fragments will be propelled far beyond this range.

== Status ==
Thailand has signed the Ottawa mine ban treaty and has destroyed all operational stocks of the mine, however it is believed to still be in use with various rebel groups in Thailand, Cambodia and possibly Burma

== Specifications ==
- Width: 115 mm
- Height: 90 mm (180 mm including legs)
- Depth: 60 mm
- Weight: 1.5 kg
- Explosive content: 0.25 kg of RDX based explosive
