= PRB-111 mine =

PRB-111
- Type: Blast mine
- Place of origin: Belgium

Specifications
- Mass: 10.5 kg (estimated)
- Length: 229 mm
- Width: 229 mm
- Height: 104 mm
- Filling: TNT
- Filling weight: 10 kg
- Detonation mechanism: Pressure pad (approximately 150 kg)

The PRB-111 is a square Belgian minimum metal anti-tank blast mine that consists of a block of explosive which may or may not be coated in asphalt. A central cavity on the top surface is covered by a plastic pressure plate, underneath which is a small well for a pressure fuze. The fuze used with the mine is the M5 pressure fuze, as used in the PRB M35 anti-personnel mine. A secondary fuze well is provided in the center of the base of the mine for fitting anti-handling devices.
