= M432 mine =

Portuguese anti-personnel mine

The M432 is a Portuguese bounding anti-personnel mine, which traces the roots of its design to the Second World War German S-mine, although it is probably more directly related to the Belgian NR 442 mine and United States M16 mine. As of 2004, all operational stocks of the mine have been destroyed, although some may have been retained for training purposes.

The mine has an olive green steel cylindrical body which has an offset fuze well on the top. The mine is used with the T253 trip and pressure fuze, similar to the M605 fuze used with the US M16 mine. The fuze has three prongs with a central post for attaching a trip wire. The fuze is triggered by either pressure applied to the prongs or tension on an attached tripwire.

Once the fuze is triggered, the inner mine body is projected into the air by a small explosive charge. The outer shell of the mine remains in the ground, and is attached to the inner body by a short length of wire. This wire pulls taut once the mine has risen to a height of approximately one metre. The jerking action pulls a striker into a detonator, triggering the main charge of the mine.

The detonation of the mine scatters approximately 1,240 fragments to an effective radius of approximately 25 meters, with widely spaced fragments still lethal at a range of at least 50 meters. The mine is reported to also be effective against soft skinned vehicles.

== Specifications ==
- Height: 131 mm (body)
  - 268 mm (body and fuze)
- Diameter: 105 mm
- Weight: 3.9 kg
- Explosive content: 0.8 kg
