= PT Mi-Ba-II mine =

Anti-tank mine

The PT Mi-Ba-II is a large Bakelite cased Czechoslovak anti-tank blast mine. The mine is unusual in that it has two plunger fuses instead of a pressure plate. The plunger fuses give the mine resistance to overpressure, also the plastic body makes it difficult to detect.

The mine is no longer produced, and it is found in Africa.

== Specifications ==
- Length: 395 mm
- Height: 135 mm
- Width: 230 mm
- Weight: 9.6 kg
- Explosive content: 6 kg of TNT
- Fuze: 2 × RO-7-II
- Operating pressure: 200 to 450 kg
