= X-200 mine =

Korean War-era improvised incendiary landmine utilised by the United States

The X-200 was a United States incendiary landmine locally improvised during the Korean War.

The X-200 consisted of a salvaged 5-US-gallon (19 L) oil can filled with napalm and fitted with a black powder bursting charge. The mine was either command-detonated or set off by trip wires. The mines were widely deployed with a report from March 1952 stating that over 11,000 had been produced and 800 had been issued that month.
