= M1935 mine =

M1935
- Type: Anti-tank mine
- Place of origin: France

Service history
- Wars: World War II

Specifications
- Mass: 12 kilograms (27 lb)
- Length: 409.6 millimetres (16.125 in)
- Width: 250 millimetres (10 in)
- Height: 121 millimetres (4.75 in)
- Filling weight: 3.25 lb (1 kg)
- Detonation mechanism: Pressure fuse of 360 kilograms (800 lb)

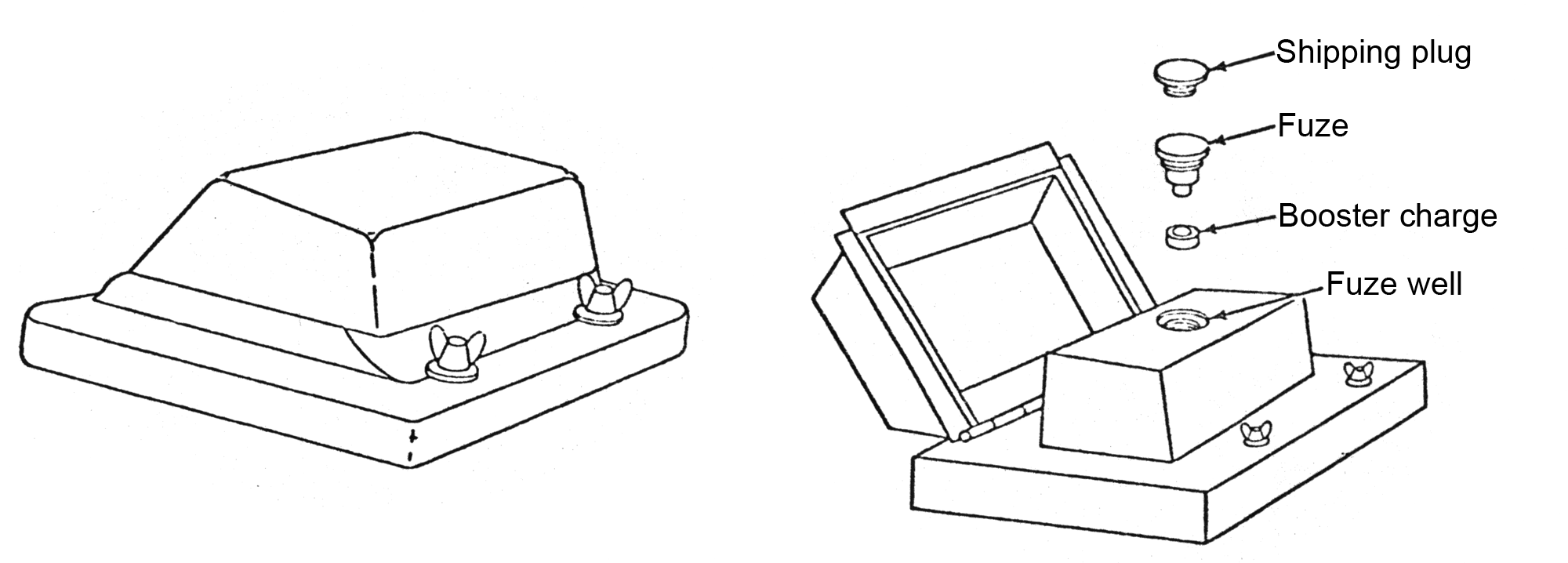
A diagram of a M1935 heavy anti-tank mine, note the thick base plate and relatively small main charge.

The M1935 (Mle 1935) is a French heavy anti-tank mine. It consists of a large heavy steel base plate with a hinged thin steel lid. Inside the lid it has a rectangular steel container, which holds the explosive charge. The mines are laid at a minimum interval of six feet.

A pressure of eight hundred pounds crushes the lid onto the pressure fuse, triggering the mines main charge. The mine uses either the M1935 or M1936 pressure fuse.
