= ATM 96 mine =

Anti-tank mine

The ATM 96 is a plastic cased Austrian anti-tank mine produced by Dynamit Nobel Wien. The mine had a dome-shaped pressure plate and an optional tilt rod fuse.

== Specifications ==
- Weight: 250 mm (approx)
- Width: 250 mm (approx)
- Height: 150 mm (approx)
