= ATM-72 mine =

Anti-tank mine

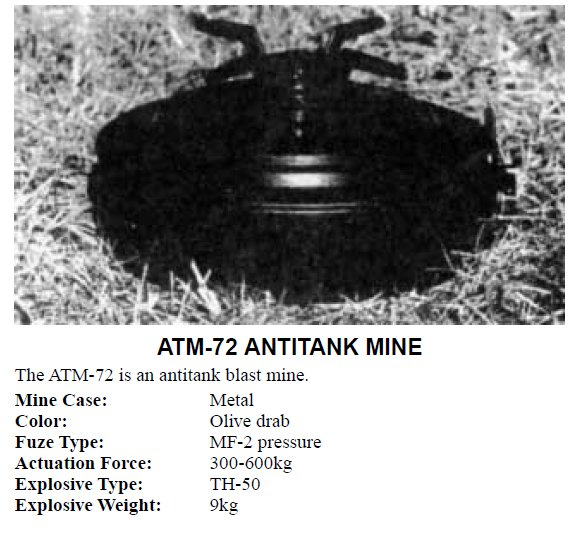
Image and info from a US Marines training manual.

The ATM-72 is a steel cased circular North Korean anti-tank mine. It is similar to the Russian TM-46, with a thick wire carrying handle and a filling plug. The mine uses a four pronged fuze, downward pressure on any of the levers will trigger the mine. The lever action of the mine makes it resistant to overpressure and blast.

The mine is found in Sudan and Korea.

== Specifications ==
- Diameter: 340 mm
- Height: 180 mm (with fuze)
- Weight: 13 kg
- Explosive content: 9 kg of Composition B
