= XM-54 mine =

Experimental United States incendiary landmine

The XM-54 was an experimental United States incendiary landmine tested during the Vietnam War. It was a large bounding mine that could either be command detonated or trip wire activated. It contained 15.3 lbs (6.9 kg) of plasticized white phosphorus. Approximately 200 were shipped to Vietnam in August 1968, and some were used operationally.
