= HAK-1 mine =

Anti-tank mine

The HAK-1 is a Hungarian plastic encased anti-tank mine. It uses a Misznay Schardin effect warhead combined with an electronic acoustic and magnetic influence fuze. The mine can be programmed for an active life of between three hours and 150 days. Once the acoustic sensor detects a target, the magnetic influence sensor is used to detonate the mine at the optimal point. The warhead is capable of penetrating 45 mm of armour and producing a 130 mm diameter hole.

It is reportedly fitted with an electronic anti-handling device , although it is not mentioned in more recent sources.

== Specifications ==
- Diameter: 220 mm
- Height: 136 mm
- Weight: 5.6 kg
- Explosive content: 2.5 kg of Composition B3 (RDX/TNT mix)
