= MKTBT mine =

- Type: Anti-tank mine
- Place of origin: Albania

Service history
- Used by: Albanian Army; Kosovo Liberation Army

Specifications
- Mass: 15 kg
- Height: 140 mm
- Diameter: 375 mm
- Filling: Self-forging fragment warhead
- Filling weight: 1.9 kg of explosive
- Detonation mechanism: Mechanical pressure fuze

The MKTBT is a large circular bakelite cased Albanian anti-tank blast mine. The mine uses a mechanical pressure fuze, copied from the Russian MV-5. The mine has relatively low metal content, including a metal carrying handle and fixing brackets, as well as six screws in the top of the mine. The mine is normally colored red-brown.

== Specifications ==
- Diameter: 375 mm (approx)
- Height: 140 mm (approx)
- Weight: 15 kg
- Explosive content: 12 kg of TNT

== Usage ==
The mine was utilized by the Kosovo Liberation Army (KLA). The KLA mainly used mines of Yugoslavian origin that were disarmed in Serbia and placed elsewhere, but also used mines acquired from elsewhere such as the MKTBT mine. According to Albanian sources, around 300,000 mines of various types including the MKTBT mine were stolen from military depots in 1997 or bought. Twenty-seven MKTBT mines were used to destroy a bridge on the Mitrovica–Leposavić road on 22 March 2000. The mines were placed under bridge supports in three-mine stacks with a 200-gram TNT detonator on top. The mine may also be present in Albania.
