= Model 52 mine =

Swedish anti-tank mine

The Model 52 mine is a Swedish circular plywood cased anti-tank blast mine. It is in service with the Swedish army. The mine can be fitted with a number of different fuzes and pressure plates including a three pronged plate and a pentagonal pressure spider and a tilt-rod fuze.

== Specifications ==
- Diameter: 345 mm
- Height: 77 mm
- Weight: 8.98 kg
- Explosive content: 7.48 kg of TNT
- Operating pressure: 250 kg or 14.5 kg tilt
