= PTM-80P mine =

Anti-tank mine

The PTM-80P is a circular plastic bodied Bulgarian minimum metal anti-tank blast mine, similar in design to the Russian TM-62P2. The mine can accept any fuze that fits into the TM-62 series of mines, including various mechanical, blast resistant, electronic, and magnetic influence fuzes. The mine is completely waterproof and can be laid in shallow water. It is currently in service with the Bulgarian armed forces.

== Specifications ==
- Diameter: 320 mm
- Height: 90 mm
- Weight: 8.93 kg
- Explosive content: 7.6 kg
- Operating pressure: 150 to 600 kg
