= PMR-4 mine =

Yugoslavian anti-personnel stake mine

The PMR-4 is a Yugoslavian anti-personnel stake mine. The mine was apparently not mass-produced, but built in small numbers.

The mine has a small grenade like main body with a number (typically 23) fragmentation grooves running around the circumference and an integral stake. The mine uses either a UPM-1 or UPM-2A fuze

== Specifications ==
- Height: 130 mm (without fuze and stake)
- Diameter: 80 mm
- Weight: 2 kg
- Explosive content: 0.2 kg of TNT (explosive) or commercial explosives
- Operating pressure: 2 to 4 kg pull
- Fuze: UPM-1 or UPM-2A
