= MMN-1 mine =

The MMN-1 is a small Georgian Claymore type directional anti-personnel fragmentation mine. The mine projects fragments in a sixty degree horizontal arc to a casualty radius of 15 meters.

== Specifications ==
- Weight: 0.8 kg
- Length: 140 mm
- Depth: 75 mm
- Height: 100 mm
- Explosive content: 0.2 kg
