= SBP-04 and SBP-07 mines =

The SBP-04 and SBP-07 are two circular Italian minimum metal anti-tank blast mines. The mines are very similar, differing only in the size of the main charge. The mines have a central raised pressure plate a fuze assembly, similar to the SH-55. They are waterproof and are non-buoyant, and have a shelf life of ten years.

The mines can be fitted with SAT programmable fuzes, which have self-neutralization and anti-handling features.

== Specifications ==
	SBP-04	SBP-07
Diameter	250 mm	300 mm
Height	110 mm	130 mm
Weight	5 kg	8.2 kg
Explosive content	4 kg	7 kg
Operating pressure	150 to 310 kg	
