= PM-60 mine =

East German anti-tank mine

The PM-60 or K-1 is a German round plastic cased minimum metal anti-tank blast mine. The case of the mine consists of two halves joined by sixteen plastic nuts, giving the mine a distinctive appearance. The top of the mine has a large pressure plate which rests on top of the fuze assembly. Two fuzes are available for the mine, a conventional ball bearing retained striker and a chemical fuze, containing a glass ampule of acid over a flash composition. When the mine is deployed with the chemical fuze it is very difficult to detect because the only metal in the mine is the detonator capsule. There is a secondary fuze well on the bottom of the mine that can accept a fuze allowing remote command detonation of the mine.

The mine was originally produced in East Germany by the State factories, but is no longer produced. It is found in Eritrea and Ethiopia.

== Specifications ==
- Weight: 11.4 kg
- Explosive content: 7.5 kg of TNT
- Diameter: 323 mm
- Height: 117 mm
- Activation pressure: 200 to 500 kg
