= Type 93 mine =

Land mine

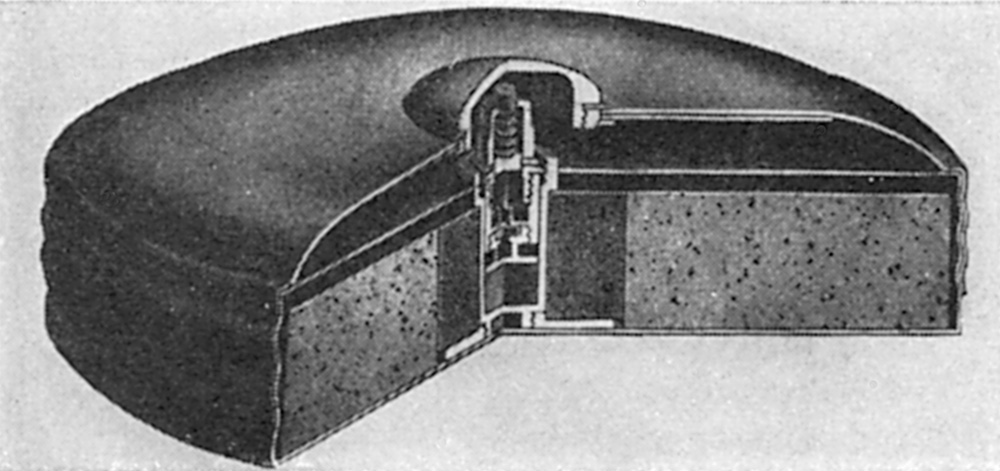
A cross section of a Japanese Type 93 mine (1933)

This is the Japanese Type 93, a high-explosive (HE), circular, pressure-actuated, anti-vehicle (AV) blast landmine used during the Second World War. The Type 93 landmine can be found made of copper, brass or steel and is fitted with the T93 landmine fuze. The T93 fuze had a variable activation pressure, achieved through the use of different thickness shear wires. The main charge could be supplemented with additional explosives buried under the landmine.

https://cat-uxo.com/explosive-hazards/landmines/type-93-landmine

== Specifications ==
Diameter: 6.75 inches Height: 1.75 inches Approx Weight: 3 lbs Explosive content: 2 lbs (Picric Acid) Operating pressure: 7 to 250 lbs (3 to 110 kg)

References. https://web.archive.org/web/20050219144251/http://www.ibiblio.org/hyperwar/Japan/IJA/HB/HB-9-2.html
