= BAT/7 mine =

BAT/7
- Type: Anti-tank mine
- Place of origin: Italy

Specifications
- Mass: 5.6 kg
- Length: 270 mm
- Width: 270 mm
- Height: 160 mm
- Filling: Misznay Schardin effect warhead
- Filling weight: 3.6 kg of explosive
- Detonation mechanism: Electronic fuse with seismic, magnetic sensors

The BAT/7 is a circular Italian plastic cased anti-tank landmine with a Misznay Schardin effect warhead. The mine's circumference has a large lip with ribs running vertically from it. The top surface of the mine also has a number of radial ribs with a central circular plate

The mine uses an electronic fuze, with a combined seismic and magnetic influence fuze. The mine is completely waterproof and does not float. The mine has an operation life of six months, and the warhead is capable of penetrating up to 200 millimeters of armour, although 150 millimeters is the claimed penetration.

The mine is no longer produced.
