= NV-41 mine =

Soviet anti-tank mine

The NV-41 was a wooden-cased Soviet anti-tank blast mine used during the Second World War. The mine consists of a square wooden box with a filling plug on the bottom. The top of the box is covered by a thin pressure lid, which covers a pressure plate held up by a spring. Sufficient pressure on the lid collapses it down onto the pressure plate. Downward movement of the pressure plate moves down a pressure plunger, which in turn levers up the striker retaining lever, releasing the spring-loaded striker and allowing it to impact the stab sensitive detonator, triggering the main charge.

The mine has a central tube in the bottom, which can either accept an electric command detonator or a wire, which is attached to the pressure plunger. The wire can anchored, allowing it to act as an anti-handling device.

== Specifications ==
- Length: 250 mm
- Weight: 8 kg
- Explosive content: 5.9 kg of TNT
