= TMD-1 and TMD-2 mines =

Yugoslavian anti-tank blast mines

The TMD-1 and TMD-2 are Yugoslavian wooden cased anti-tank blast mines, similar to the Russian TMD-B. The box consists of a wooden box, which contains the main cast TNT main charge. A webbing carrying handle is provided on one side of the mine. The fuze is placed in a central detonation well under the centre board of three that are fixed to the top of the mine. When sufficient pressure is placed on the boards, they collapse inwards, pressing on the installed fuze triggering the mine.

Either a UANU-1 or MV-5 fuze can be used with the mine. Additionally the mine can be used as an anti-personnel mine by allowing the trigger central board to rest directly on the fuze. The mines are found in Bosnia and Croatia.

== Specifications ==
- Length: 320 mm
- Width: 280 mm
- Height: 140 mm
- Weight: 7.5 kg
- Explosive content: 5.5 kg of TNT
- Operating pressure: 200 kg
