= M 51 and M 52 MACI mines =

Anti-tank mines

The M 51 MACI and M 52 MACI (Mine Antichar Indétectable) are French circular minimum metal anti-tank blast mines. The use a variety of fuzes, a M61 pressure/friction fuze, a "tentacle" fuze with four hoses that triggers the mine when two of the opposite tentacles are crushed, and a tilt rod fuze. The M51 and M52 are broadly similar with a thin fibreglass cases, the principal difference being the M52 is slightly larger than the M51.

== Specifications ==
Mine	Diameter	Height	Weight	Explosive content	Operating pressure
M 51 MACI	300 mm	95 mm	7 kg	TNT and RDX	various, pressure fuze with 300 kg
M 52 MACI	300 mm	120 mm	9 kg	TNT and RDX	various, pressure fuze with 300 kg
