= AT-8 (Cuban mine) =

Cuban anti-tank mine

The AT-8 or Cuban anti-tank mine is a square green plastic cased anti-tank mine. It is a scaled-up version of the Cuban anti-personnel mine. The mine consists of a plastic ribbed hinged upper case which rests on the fuzes placed into the lower plastic case. When enough pressure is placed on the upper lid the strikers are released from the fuzes. This triggers the main charge, which consists of up to twenty 400 g blocks of TNT. The mine is fitted with MUV or RO-1 type fuzes.

The mine is found in Angola, Nicaragua, and possibly Cuba.

== Specifications ==
- Weight: 9 kg
- Explosive content: 8 kg (20 × 400 g TNT blocks)
- Length: 338 mm
- Height: 117 mm (un-armed)
- Width: 227 mm
- Operating pressure: 50 to 100 kg (estimated), possibly as low as 1 kg without the shear pins.
