= AUPS mine =

Anti-personnel mine

The AUPS is a circular Italian bakelite cased minimum metal anti-personnel blast mine. The mine can be adapted with a steel fragmentation jacket and stake into a fragmentation stake mine. The mine is constructed in two halves, with the upper half containing the pressure fuse mechanism, the lower half contains the main charge and the detonator. The mine case is normally unpainted bakelite brown.

When used as a stake mine the mine is inverted and an MUV type pull fuse is inserted into the base of the mine, and the normal pressure fuse hole is used to attach the mine to the stake. When used with the fragmentation jacket the mine has a lethal radius of 15 metres, although the fragments may be lethal at greater range.

== Specifications ==
- Diameter:
  - mine: 102 mm
  - with fragmentation jacket: 120 mm
- Height:
  - mine: 36 mm
  - with fragmentation jacket: 80 mm
- Weight:
  - mine: 0.3 kg
  - with fragmentation jacket: 1.68 kg
- Explosive content: 0.115 kg of Composition B
- Operating pressure:
  - pressure fuse: 10 to 20 kg (approx)
  - pull fuse: 1 to 5 kg
