= Reich Labour Service =

Organization in Nazi Germany

- Reichsarbeitsdienst – RAD
- House flag with RAD symbol

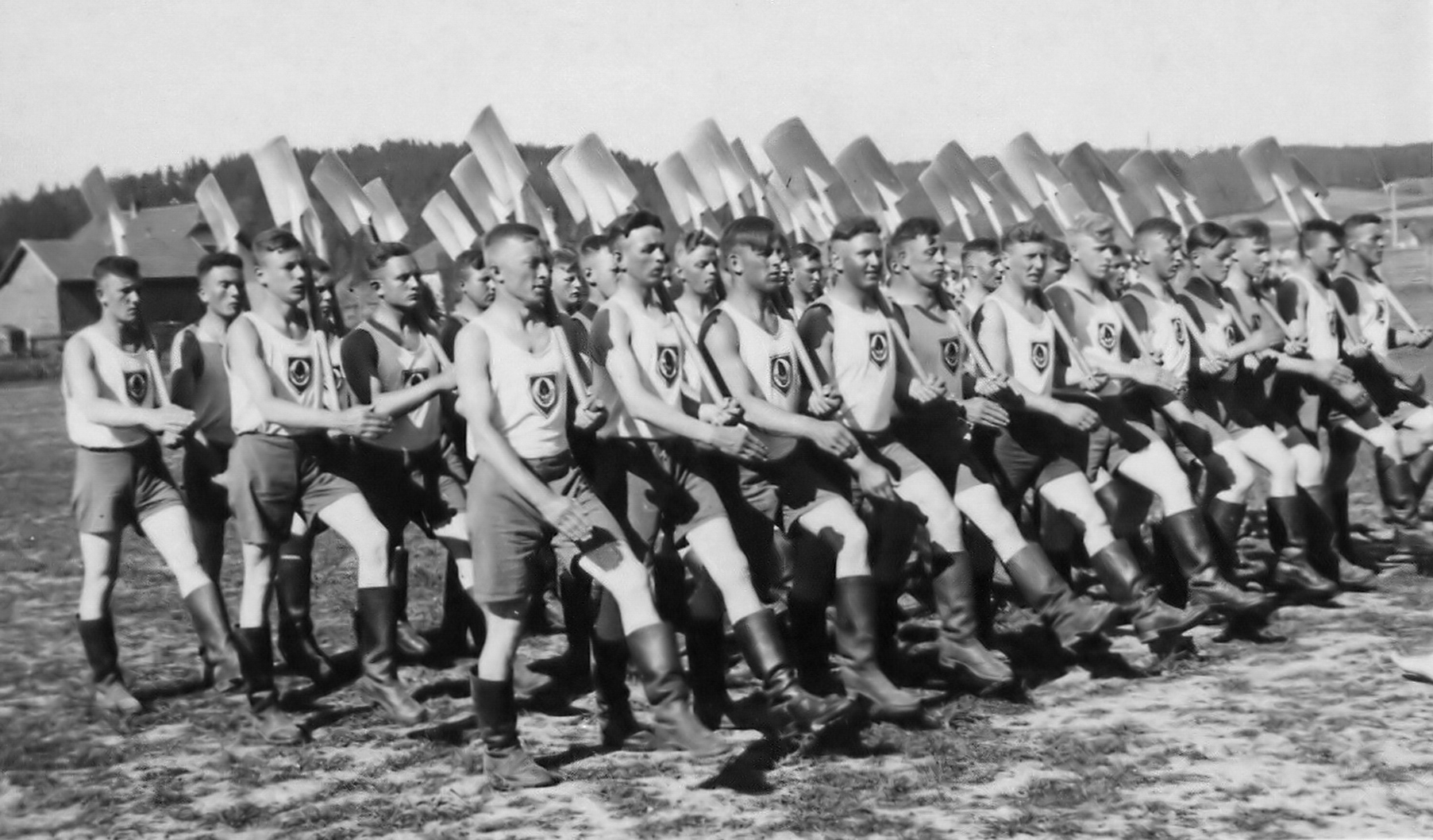
- An RAD squad in 1940

Agency overview
- Formed: 26 June 1935
- Preceding agencies: Freiwilliger Arbeitsdienst (FAD); Nationalsozialistischer Arbeitsdienst (NSAD)
- Dissolved: 8 May 1945
- Type: Labour Army
- Jurisdiction: (Nazi Germany) Nazi Germany; Occupied Europe
- Headquarters: Berlin–Grunewald; 52°29′31″N 13°17′6″E
- Employees: 200,000 (1935); 350,000 (October 1939)
- Agency executives: Konstantin Hierl; Wilhelm Decker, Deputy
- Parent agency: Reich Ministry of the Interior

The Reich Labour Service (Reichsarbeitsdienst; RAD) was a major paramilitary organization established in Nazi Germany as an agency to help mitigate the effects of unemployment on the German economy, militarise the workforce and indoctrinate it with Nazi ideology. It was the official state labour service, divided into separate sections for men and women.

From June 1935 onward, men aged between 18 and 25 may have served six months before their military service. During World War II, compulsory service also included young women, and the RAD developed to an auxiliary formation which provided support for the Wehrmacht armed forces.

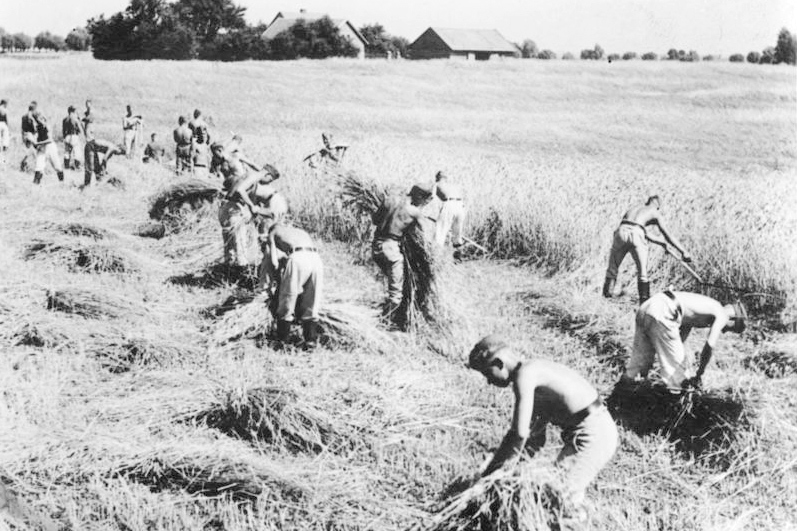
RAD members working in the field, East Prussia, 1938

== Foundation ==
In the course of the Great Depression, the German government of the Weimar Republic under Chancellor Heinrich Brüning by emergency decree established the Freiwilliger Arbeitsdienst ('Voluntary Labour Service', FAD), on 5 June 1931, two years before the Nazi Party (NSDAP) ascended to national power. The state-sponsored employment organisation provided services to civic and land improvement projects. From 16 July 1932 it was headed by Friedrich Syrup in the official rank of a Reichskommissar. As the name stated, participation was voluntary.

The concept was adopted by Adolf Hitler, who upon the Nazi seizure of power in 1933 appointed Konstantin Hierl state secretary in the Reich Ministry of Labour, responsible for FAD matters. Hierl was already a high-ranking member of the NSDAP and head of the party's labour organisation, the Nationalsozialistischer Arbeitsdienst or NSAD. Hierl developed the concept of a state labour service organisation similar to the Reichswehr army, with a view to implementing a compulsory service. Meant as an evasion of the regulations set by the 1919 Treaty of Versailles, voluntariness initially was maintained after protests by the Geneva World Disarmament Conference.

Hierl's rivalry with Labour Minister Franz Seldte led to the affiliation of his office as a FAD Reichskommissar with the Interior Ministry under his party fellow Wilhelm Frick. On 11 July 1934, the NSAD was renamed Reichsarbeitsdienst or RAD with Hierl as its director until the end of World War II. By law issued on 26 June 1935, the RAD was re-established as an amalgamation of the many prior labour organisations formed in Germany during the Weimar Republic, with Hierl appointed as Reich Labour Leader (Reichsarbeitsführer) according to the Führerprinzip. With massive financial support by the German government, RAD members were to provide service for civic and agricultural construction projects. Per Reich Labor Service Act of June 26, 1935:

§ 1.

(1) The Reich Labor Service is honorary service to the German people.

(2) All young Germans of both sexes are obliged to serve their people in the Reich Labor Service.

(3) The Reich Labor Service is intended to educate German youth in the spirit of National Socialism in national community and in the true concept of work, above all in the due respect for manual work.

(4) The Reich Labor Service is intended to carry out charitable work.

§ 2.

(1) The Reich Labor Service is subordinate to the Reich Minister of the Interior. Under him, the Reich Labor Leader exercises command over the Reich Labor Service.

(2) The Reich Labor Leader stands at the head of the Reich leadership of the Labor Service; he determines the organization, regulates the work assignment and directs training and education.

== Organization ==
RAD flag, Female Section, in use between 1935–1945

The RAD was divided into two major sections, one for men (Reichsarbeitsdienst Männer – RAD/M) and the voluntary, from 1939 compulsory, section for young women (Reichsarbeitsdienst der weiblichen Jugend – RAD/wJ).

The RAD was composed of 33 districts each called an Arbeitsgau (lit. 'Work District') similar to the Gaue subdivisions of the Nazi Party. Each of these districts was headed by an Arbeitsgauführer officer with headquarters staff and a Wachkompanie (Guard Company). Under each district were between six and eight Arbeitsgruppen (Work Groups), battalion-sized formations of 1200–1800 men. These groups were divided into six company-sized RAD-Abteilung units.

Conscripted personnel had to move into labour barracks. Each rank and file RAD man was supplied with a spade and a bicycle. A paramilitary uniform was implemented in 1934; beside the swastika brassard, the RAD symbol, an arm badge in the shape of an upward pointing shovel blade, was displayed on the upper left shoulder of all uniforms and great-coats worn by all personnel. Men and women had to work up to 76 hours a week.

=== Arbeitsdank ("Labor Thanks") ===
A health- and life-insurance program for NSAD members (from November 1933 to June 1935) and RAD workers (from June 1935 to 1945) in case they became ill or were injured or killed while on the job. The pre-war organization would also provide funding for education or training for poor members so they could learn a trade or get a university degree. Members had to carry a Mitgliedskarte ("membership card") that gave personal information (name, birthdate, and birthplace) and identified which Arbeitsgau and Mitgliedschaft ("membership group") they were assigned to, kind of like a soldier's Soldbuch ("military identification booklet").

Workers who benefited from the Arbeitsdank program were encouraged to pay back into it with donations. Donors received an enameled Erinnerungsnadel ("commemorative pin") that used the oval NSAD or RAD symbol with the text Arbeits / Dank added in the colored border. Officials and employees of the organization wore a larger version of the pin to indicate their status.

== War ==
The RAD was classed as Wehrmachtgefolge (lit. 'Defence Force Followers'). Auxiliary forces with this status, while not a part of the Armed Forces themselves, provided such vital support that they were given protection by the Geneva Convention. Some, including the RAD, were militarized.

Just prior to the outbreak of World War II, nearly all the RAD/M's extant RAD-Abteilung units were either incorporated into the Heer's Bautruppen (Construction troops) as an expedient to rapidly increase their numbers or else in a few cases transferred to the Luftwaffe to form the basis of new wartime construction units for that service. New units were quickly formed to replace them.

During the early war Norwegian and Western campaigns, hundreds of RAD units were engaged in supplying frontline troops with food and ammunition, repairing damaged roads and constructing and repairing airstrips. Throughout the course of the war, the RAD were involved in many projects. The RAD units constructed coastal fortifications (many RAD men worked on the Atlantic Wall), laid minefields, manned fortifications, and even helped guard vital locations and prisoners.

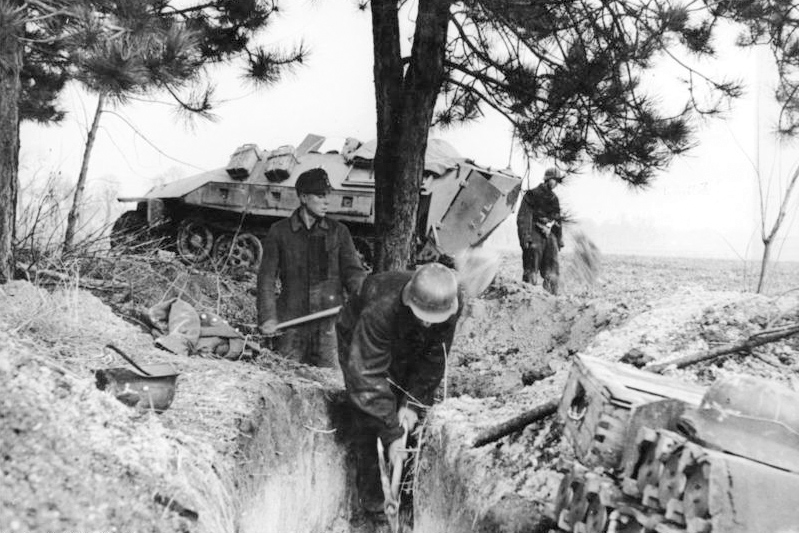
RAD members digging a trench for a RAD flak battery in March 1945

The role of the RAD was not limited to combat support functions. Hundreds of RAD units received training as anti-aircraft units and were deployed as RAD Flak Batteries. Several RAD units also performed combat on the eastern front as infantry. As the German defences were devastated, more and more RAD men were committed to combat. During the final months of the war, RAD men formed 6 major frontline units, which were involved in serious fighting.

=== Operation Market Garden ===
During Operation Market-Garden in September 1944, RAD troops were used as reinforcements. Losses for these troops were in the hundreds. Some RAD troops were assigned to the 9th SS Pionier Abteilung ("Engineer Battalion") under SS-Hauptsturmführer Hans Moeller as part of Kampfgruppe Moeller. The understrength unit was made up of 90 Pioneers armed with flamethrowers and extra machineguns, which Moeller divided into two assault companies. On 17 September, SS-Kampfgruppe Moeller advanced from the railway station but were blocked just east of the Arnhem town square by the British 2nd and 3rd Parachute Battalions. They engaged in intense house to house fighting, which allowed their parent formation SS-Kampfgruppe Spindler to dig in and form a defensive line. The 2nd Parachute Battalion under Col. John Frost snuck past and took the Arnhem Bridge, but were then encircled by the German forces.

Moeller's Pioneers were then involved in the fighting on 18 September to reduce the British perimeter and retake the northern end of the Arnhem bridge. It was noted that the RAD troops had no combat experience. Captain Moeller's report concluded: "These men were rather skeptical and reluctant at the beginning, which was hardly surprising. But when they were put in the right place they helped us a lot; and in time they integrated completely, becoming good and reliable comrades."

== Equipment ==
- Luger pistol
- Gewehr 98
- Mannlicher M1895
- Stielhandgranate
- Model 39 grenade
- Schiessbecher
- Panzerfaust
- Sturmpistole
- Panzerbüchse 39
- MP 3008
- Einstossflammenwerfer 46
- MG 08
- Schwarzlose machine gun
- Teller mine
- S-mine
- Stock mine
- Schu-mine 42
- Glasmine 43
- Abwehrflammenwerfer 42
- Topfmine
- Riegel mine 43
- 2 cm Flak 30/38/Flakvierling
- Volkswagen Kübelwagen
- Opel Blitz
- Mercedes-Benz L3000
- Krupp Protze
- Sd.Kfz. 2
- M42 Truppenfahrrad

== See also ==
- Assault pioneer
- Bevin Boys
- Civilian Conservation Corps
- Construction soldier (East Germany)
- Deutscher Aufbaudienst
- Forced labour under German rule during World War II
- Labour Army
- Labour battalion
- Organisation Todt
- Work Order Act
