= Teller mine =

German antitank mine in World War II

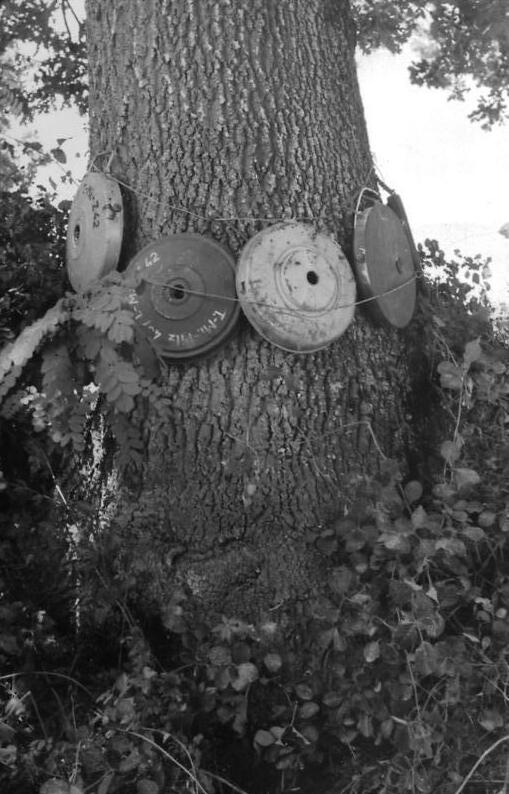
Various Tellermines strapped to a tree. Fuzes and pressure-plates have not been fitted

The Teller mine (German: Tellermine) was a German-made antitank mine common in World War II. With explosives sealed inside a sheet metal casing and fitted with a pressure-actuated fuze, Teller mines had a built-in carrying handle on the side. As the name suggests (Teller is the German word for dish or plate) the mines were plate-shaped.

== Design ==
Containing between 5-5.5 kilos (11-12 lbs.) of TNT (sometimes Amatol), and a fuze activation pressure of approximately 200 lb (91 kg), the Teller mine was capable of blasting the tracks off any World War II-era tank or destroying a lightly armored vehicle. Due to its rather high operating pressure, only a vehicle or heavy object passing over the Teller mine would set it off.

Of the two types of pressure-fuze available for Teller mines, the T.Mi.Z.43 fuze was notable for featuring an integral anti-handling device as standard: when the T.Mi.Z.43 fuze is inserted and the pressure plate (or screw cap) is screwed down into place, it shears a weak arming pin inside the fuze with an audible "snap". This action arms the anti-handling device. Thereafter, any attempt to disarm the mine by unscrewing the pressure plate (or screw cap) to remove the fuze will automatically release the spring-loaded firing pin inside it, triggering detonation.

Since it is impossible to determine which fuze type has been installed, no pressure plate or screw cap can ever be safely removed from a Teller mine. The T.Mi.Z.43 fuze can be fitted to the Teller mine 35, 42 and 43 series.

To hinder demining, all Teller mines featured two additional fuze wells (located on the side and underneath) to enable anti-handling devices to be attached, typically some form of pull-fuze.

== Models ==
There were four models of Teller mine made during World War II:

- Teller mine 43
- Teller mine 42
- Teller mine 35
- Teller mine 29

Approximately 3,622,900 Teller mine 43 mines were produced by Germany for the Wehrmacht from 1943 to 1944.

== Gallery ==
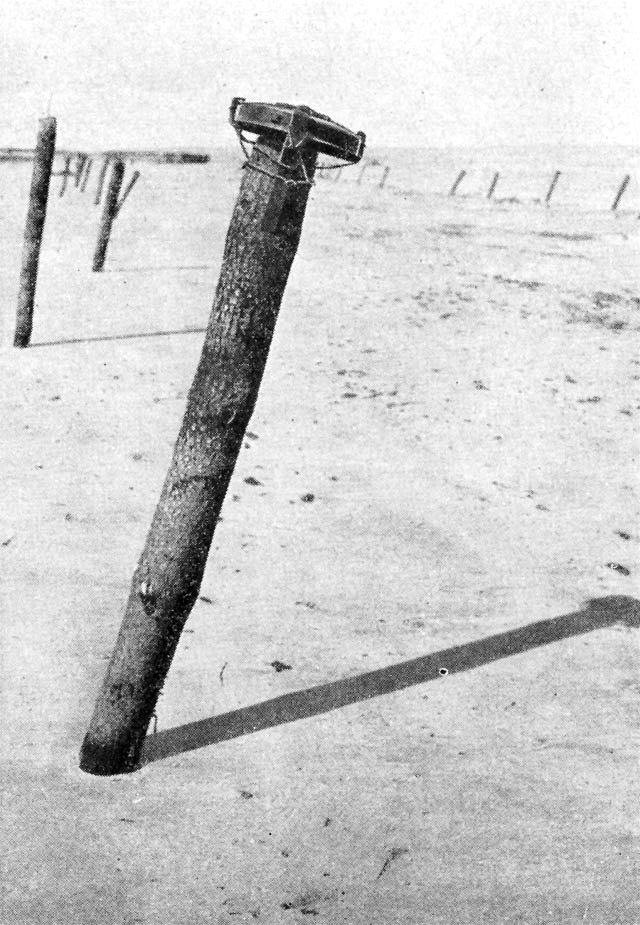
Teller mine on Utah Beach, intended to explode against landing craft at high tide

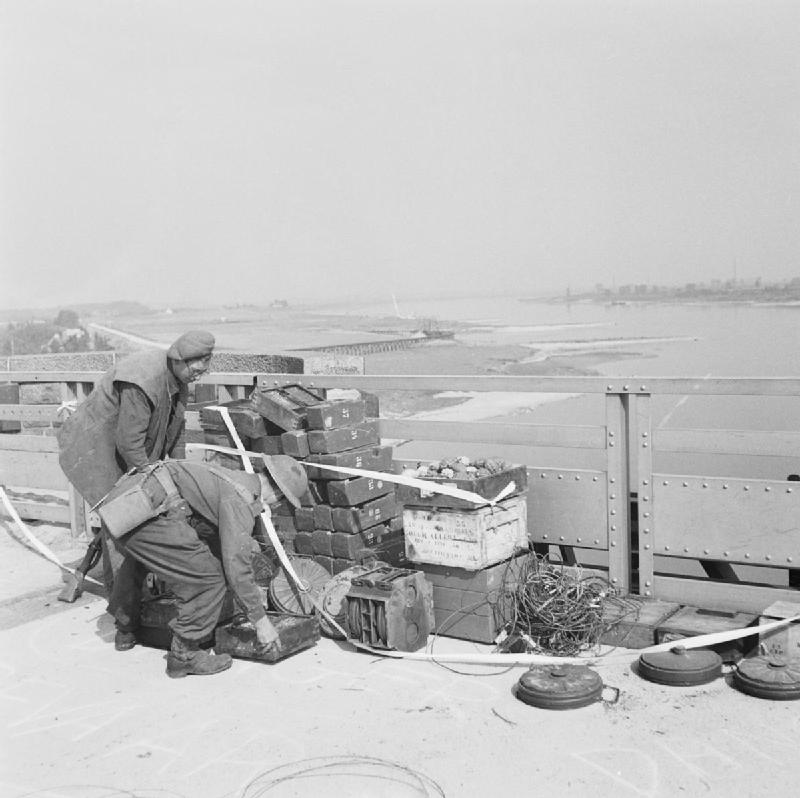
British engineers removing the charges which the Germans had set to blow the Nijmegen bridge, September 1944

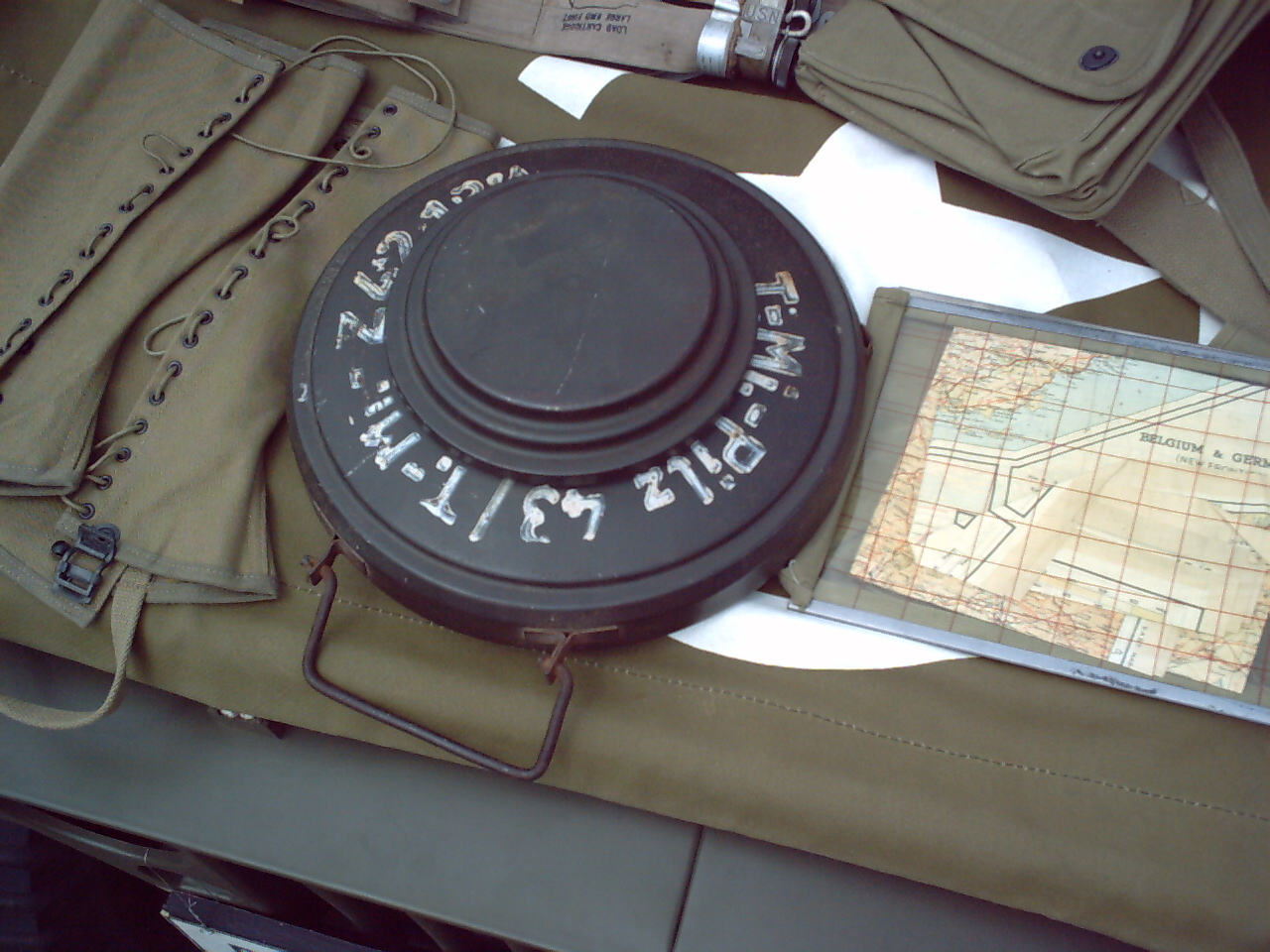
Tellermine 43 anti-tank mine
