= T-AB-1 AT mine =

Anti-tank mine

The T-AB-1 is a rectangular plastic cased Brazilian anti-tank blast mine. The mine uses a T-AB-1 anti-personnel mine as a fuze. The AP mine is inserted into the body of the AT mine under a large stiff ABS plastic pressure plate. The pressure plate is fastened in place by a number of shear pins, which are designed to give way under a pressure of 200 kg. The AP mine under the pressure plate is then triggered, triggering the mine's main charge.

The mine is waterproof and can be laid in water up to 1.2 meters deep. It is shock-resistant and can be laid as close as two meters apart without causing sympathetic detonation.

The status of the mine is unclear; all operational stocks of the AP mine used as the trigger for the mine have been destroyed, and all production of mines ceased in 1989. The mine is still available for use in Ecuador.

== Specifications ==
- Length: 243 mm
- Width: 243 mm
- Height: 138 mm
- Weight: 5.9 kg
- Explosive content: 5.2 kg of TNT
- Operating pressure: 200 kg
