= MATS/2.6 mine =

Italian anti-tank mine

The MATS/2.6 is a scatterable Italian circular, plastic-cased minimum metal blast resistant anti-tank blast mine. It is very similar to the MATS/2, except that it uses a smooth pressure plate rather than a griddle pressure plate. It uses a pneumatic fuse which is resistant to shock and blast similar to the fuze fitted to the TS-50. The mine's plastic case is waterproof, and the mine can be scattered from a helicopter.

The mine is no longer in production.

== Specifications ==
- Diameter: 260 mm
- Height: 90 mm
- Weight: 5 kg
- Explosive content: 2.4 kg of Trotyl / Ammonite 80
