= Tellermine 43 =

Anti-tank mine

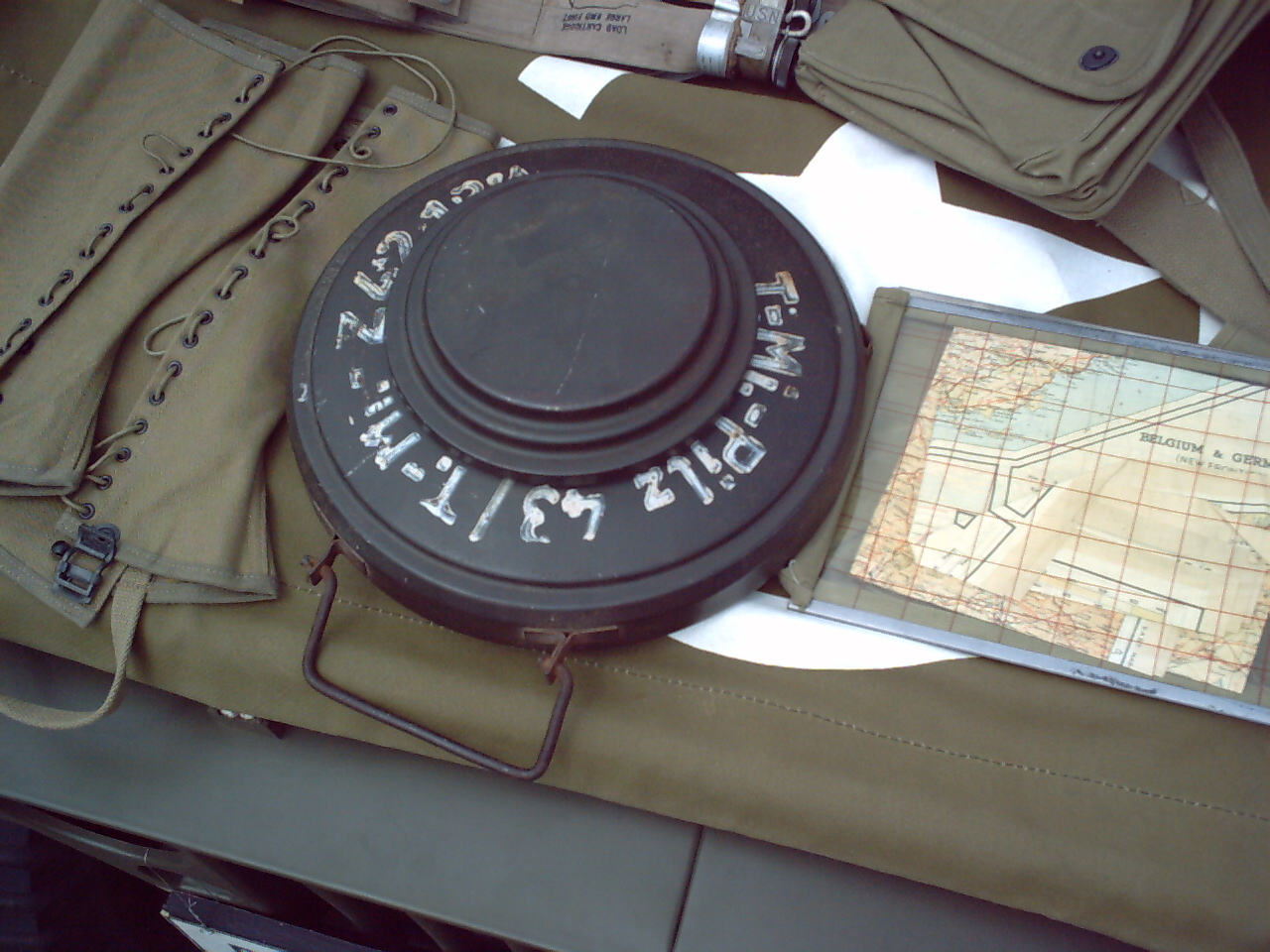
Tellermine 43 anti-tank mine

The Tellermine 43 was a German circular steel-cased anti-tank blast mine used during the Second World War. It was a simplified version of the Tellermine 42, which enabled simpler production techniques. Between March 1943 and the end of World War II, Germany produced over 3.6 million Tellermine 43s. Several countries produced copies of the mine including Denmark (M/47), France (Model 1948) and Yugoslavia (TMM-1).

Finland used these mines with the designation PANSSARIMIINA m/43.

== Description ==
The casing of the Teller mine is circular, rising toward the center with a large flat pressure plate. A rectangular metal carrying handle is fitted to the side of the mine. The pressure plate sits over the fuze well which can hold either a T.Mi.Z.42 shear pin fuze or T.Mi.Z.43 ball release fuze. The mine is armed by removing the pressure plate, screwing a fuze into the fuze well, then screwing the pressure plate back on again. At the bottom of the fuze well is a PETN booster charge, surrounded by the doughnut-shaped main charge of TNT explosive. The mine has secondary fuze wells located on the side and base to enable anti-handling devices to be fitted if required. Additionally, the T.Mi.Z.43 fuze features an integral anti-handling device as standard: when the fuze is inserted and the pressure plate screwed down into place, it shears a weak arming pin in the fuze with an audible "snap". This action arms the anti-handling device. Thereafter, any attempt to disarm the mine by unscrewing the pressure plate (to remove the fuze) will automatically trigger detonation.

Since it is impossible to determine which fuze type has been installed, no pressure plate should be removed from a Tellermine. The Tellermine 43 can also be fitted with an optional tilt-rod fuze, which is screwed into the side fuze well. Anti-tank mines with this type of fuze were capable of inflicting much more damage to armored vehicles. This was demonstrated numerous times in the Normandy Campaign. On June 8, 1944, a Sherman tank was accompanying the 2nd Ranger Battalion in an attack on the Maisy battery. It ran over a Tellermine and was blown to pieces, with a total crew loss. Sergeant John Robert "Bob" Slaughter describes the scene: "The explosive energy from that hidden teller mine sent the 32-ton Sherman tank into the ditch on its side. This scene echoed the bloody, grotesque carnage of D-Day. One minute they were healthy young men, and the next minute they were bloody arms and legs wrapped around bloody torsos. We found body parts and shoes with the feet still stuck in them twenty-five yards away."

== Specifications ==
- Height: 102 mm (4 in)
- Diameter: 318 mm (12.5 in)
- Weight: 8.1 kg (17 lb 14 oz)
- Explosive content: 5.5 kg (12 lb 2 oz) TNT (sometimes amatol)
- Trigger weight: 100–180 kg (220–400 lb)

== Bibliography ==
- Jane's Mines and Mine Clearance 2005-2006
- TM-E 30-451, Handbook of German Military Forces
