= YM-III mine =

Iranian anti-tank mine

The YM-III or YM-3 is a circular ABS plastic cased Iranian minimum metal anti-tank blast mine. It is a copy of the Chinese Type 72 non-metallic anti-tank mine. The mine uses a blast-resistant fuze, which relies on the gradual application of pressure to trigger it. The mine is found in Afghanistan, Bosnia, Iran, and Iraq.

== Specifications ==
- Diameter: 270 mm
- Height: 110 mm
- Weight: 7 kg
- Explosive content: 5.7 kg of Composition B
- Operating pressure: 450 to 900 kg
