= Tellermine 42 =

German anti-tank mine

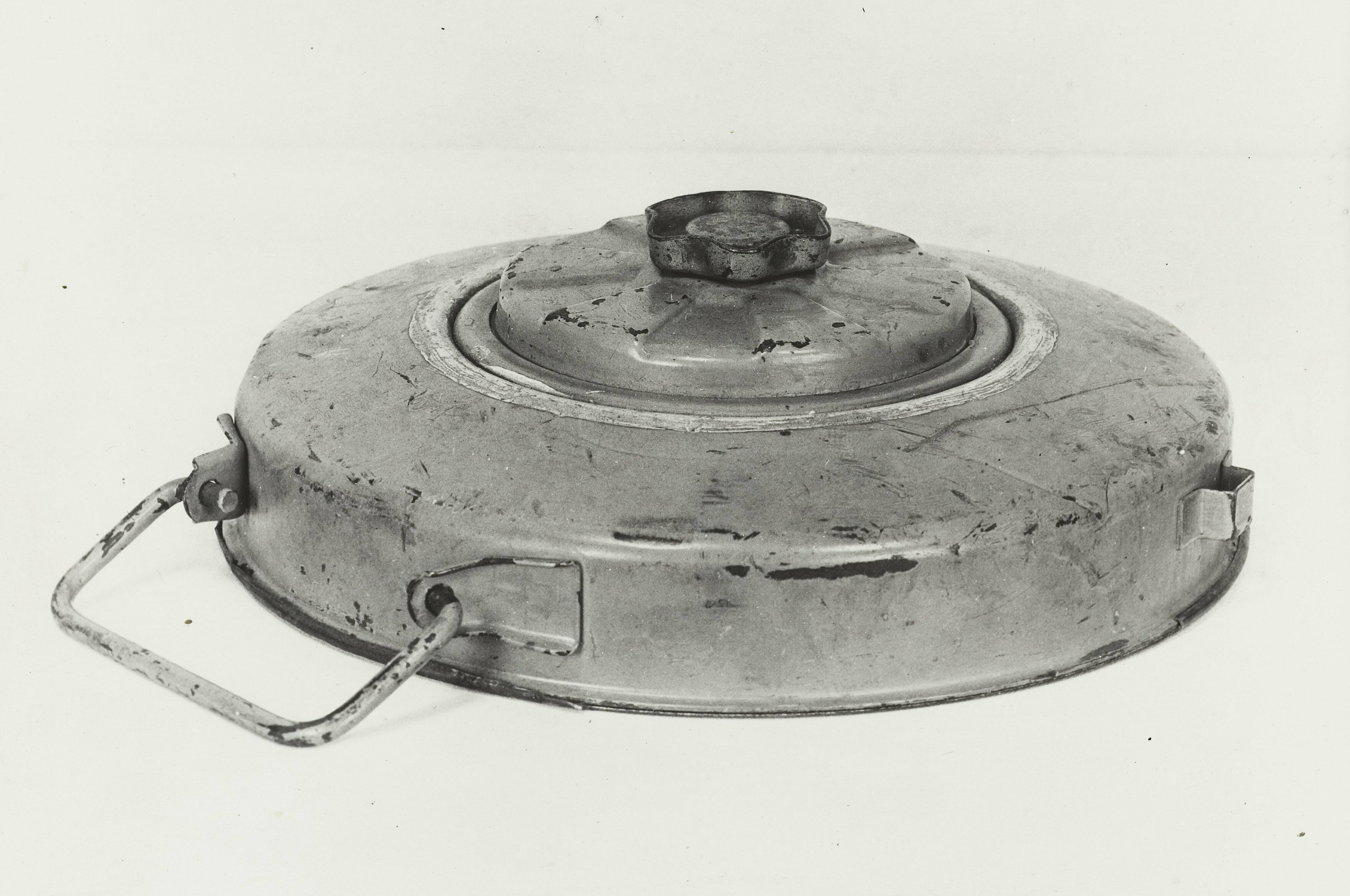
- Tellermine 42
- Type: anti-tank mine

Service history
- Used by: Germany
- Wars: World War II

Specifications
- Mass: 9.1 kg (20 lb 1 oz)
- Height: 102 mm (4 in)
- Diameter: 324 mm (12.8 in)
- Filling: TNT
- Filling weight: 5.5 kg (12 lb 2 oz)
- Detonation mechanism: Pressure - weight of 100 to 180 kilograms (220 to 400 lb)

The Tellermine 42 (T.Mi.42) was a German metal-cased anti-tank blast mine used during the Second World War. The mine was a development of the Tellermine 35 with improved resistance to blast. It was followed by the simplified Tellermine 43.

The Tellermine consists of a circular pressed steel main body with a large central pressure plate. The pressure plate is smaller than the earlier Tellermine 35, which increases the mine's resistance to blast. Two secondary fuze wells are provided for anti-handling devices, one in the side, and one on the bottom of the mine. The mine has a carrying handle.

The T.Mi.Z.43 pressure fuze can be fitted to Tellermine 42s. The T.Mi.Z.43 fuze is notable for featuring an integral anti-handling device as standard: when the fuze is inserted and the pressure plate screwed down into place, it shears a weak arming pin in the fuze with an audible "snap". This action arms the anti-handling device. Thereafter, any attempt to disarm the mine by unscrewing the pressure plate (to remove the fuze) will automatically trigger detonation. Since it is impossible to determine which fuze type has been installed, no pressure plate should ever be removed from a Tellermine.

Finland used these mines under the designation PANSSARIMIINA m/42.

== Specifications ==
- Height: 102 mm (4 in)
- Diameter: 324 mm (12.8 in)
- Weight: 9.1 kg (20 lb 1 oz)
- Explosive content: 5.5 kg (12 lb 2 oz) of TNT or 50/50 Amatol
- Trigger weight: 100–180 kg (220–400 lb)

== Bibliography ==
- Jane's Mines and Mine Clearance 2005-2006
- TM-E 30-451, Handbook of German Military Forces
