= Type 72 =

Type 72 may refer to:

- Type 72 metallic anti-tank mine, a Chinese metallic anti-tank mine
- Type 72 non-metallic anti-tank mine, a Chinese plastic anti-tank mine
- Type 72Z, a Chinese tank upgrade to the Type 59 tank
