= Type 72 metallic anti-tank mine =

Chinese anti-tank mine

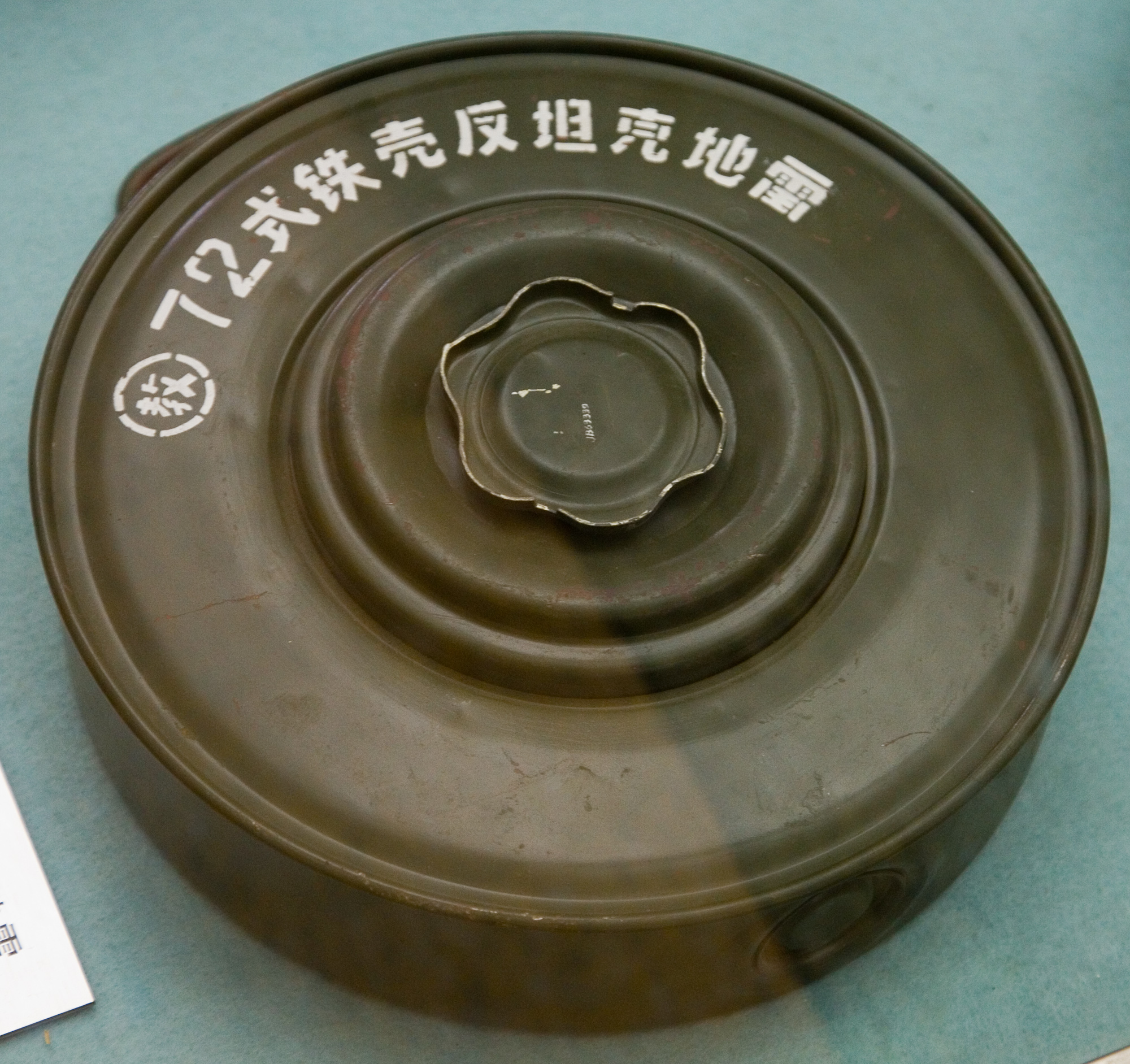
A Type 72 metallic anti-tank mine on display at the Beijing military museum.

The Type 72 is a Chinese metal-cased circular anti-tank blast mine, it is similar to the Russian TM-46 mine, a plastic cased version of the mine is also produced, the Type 72 non-metallic anti-tank mine. The mine has a central plastic cased blast resistant fuze.

== Specifications ==
- Weight: 8 kg
- Explosive content: 5 kg of TNT (explosive)/RDX
- Diameter: 279 mm
- Height: 93 mm
- Operating pressure: 300 to 370 kg
