= A.T. Mine E.P. Mark VI =

- Type: Anti-tank mine
- Place of origin: Egypt

Service history
- Used by: United Kingdom and Commonwealth
- Wars: World War II

Specifications
- Mass: 8.5lb(3.86kg)
- Height: 3.25in(8.255cm)
- Diameter: 8in(20.32cm)
- Filling: TNT
- Filling weight: 4.5lb(2.04kg)

The A.T. Mine E.P.(Egyptian pattern) Mark VI was a World War II anti-tank mine.

== Design ==
This mine is always said to be in the shape of a mushroom. This is true for this particular mine in terms of the mine resembling an upper part of a mushroom being a lot more flat on top and far less curved and using more straight lines. This mine has a cover which is attached to the mine through three pins which engage with slots in the retaining straps of the mine. The mine was detonated on contact with a vehicle by the pressure applied when the vehicle goes over the mine making the mine striker go through shear wire after which the striker spring makes the striker go inside the percussion cap which detonates the mine. To arm the mine take off the cover and place it where you want it for your defence and then put in the fuze and remove the safety pin from the safety pin hole in the striker and then put the cover back and then it is armed. To make it safe just do the opposite take off the cover then take out the fuze and reinsert the safety pin and then put back on the cover and then the mine is safe.

== Service ==
In service this mine was capable of blowing the tracks off medium and light tanks and severely damaging lesser armoured vehicles. The mine's Egyptian origin (E.P. being Egyptian pattern) shows it was mainly used by British and commonwealth forces during the North African campaign.
