= Sacrificial part =

Component engineered to fail first to protect the rest of the device

A sacrificial part is a part of a machine or product that is intentionally engineered to fail under excess mechanical stress, electrical stress, chemical stress or other unexpected and dangerous situations. The sacrificial part is engineered to fail first, thus breaking the serial connection and protecting other parts of the system downstream.

== Examples ==
Examples of sacrificial parts include:

- Derailleur hanger, see also universal derailleur hanger
- Electrical fuses
- Fusible plug
- Galvanic anodes
- Mechanical shear pins
- Over-pressure burst disks
- Pyrotechnic fastener
- Some leader lines used in angling

== Gallery ==
Broken deraileur hanger and replacement part (note the predetermined breaking point)

Car fuses, intact and broken

Galvanic anode with shaft line cutter (new compared to after two years in use)

== See also ==
- Factor of safety, system strength beyond planned load
- Frangibility, material that breaks up into parts instead of deforming as one
- Overengineering, designing a product that is needlessly complicated
