= Tellermine 29 =

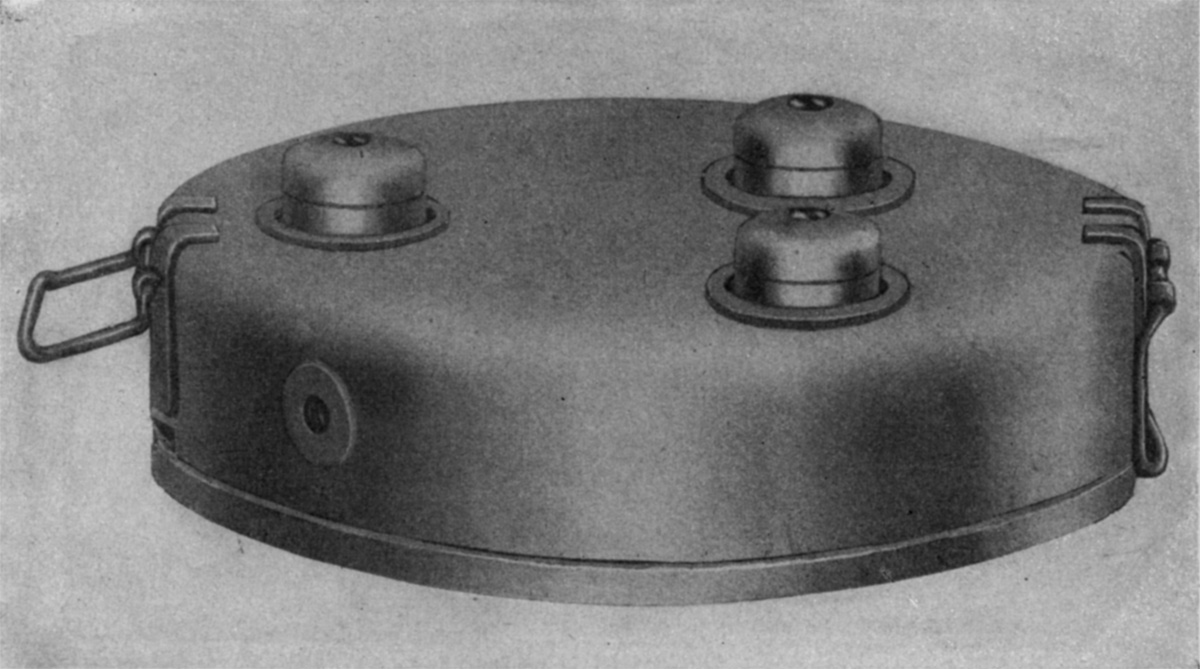
- A Tellermine 29 showing the three fuzes.
- Type: Anti-tank blast mine
- Place of origin: Germany

Service history
- In service: 1929–1945
- Used by: Germany
- Wars: World War II

Production history
- Designed: 1929
- No. built: 61,000 approx
- Variants: T.Mi.29 (Ueb)

Specifications
- Mass: 6 kg (13 lb 4 oz)
- Height: 0.07 m (3 in) (without fuse)
- Diameter: 0.25 m (9.8 in)
- Filling: TNT
- Filling weight: 4.5 kg (9 lb 15 oz)
- Detonation mechanism: Three ZDZ 29 pressure fuzes

The Tellermine 29 is a round, metal-cased German anti-tank blast landmine. It first entered service in 1929, and the initial German defence plan was to purchase 6,000 a year, but in January 1931 it was decided to speed up the purchase process, and 61,418 were ordered. By 1937, with the introduction of the Tellermine 35, it was being used for training, and the majority were sent to warehouses.

The mine did see limited service during the Second World War, notably after D-Day in France, where allied troops reported encountering it.

The mine uses three Z.D.Z. 29 fuzes that are normally set at an activation pressure of 125 kg, but can be set to function with a pressure of just 45 kg or even function as a tripwire fuze. The mine is fitted with two secondary fuze wells that enable the fitting of anti-handling devices.

A training version of the mine designated T.Mi.29 (Ueb) was also produced that was filled with a smoke-generating main charge and holes along the circumference to allow the smoke to escape.

A number of Yugoslavian mines copied the basic pattern of the Tellermine 29, including the TMA 3 and TMA 4.
