= FFV 028 mine =

Series of Swedish anti-tank mines

FFV 028
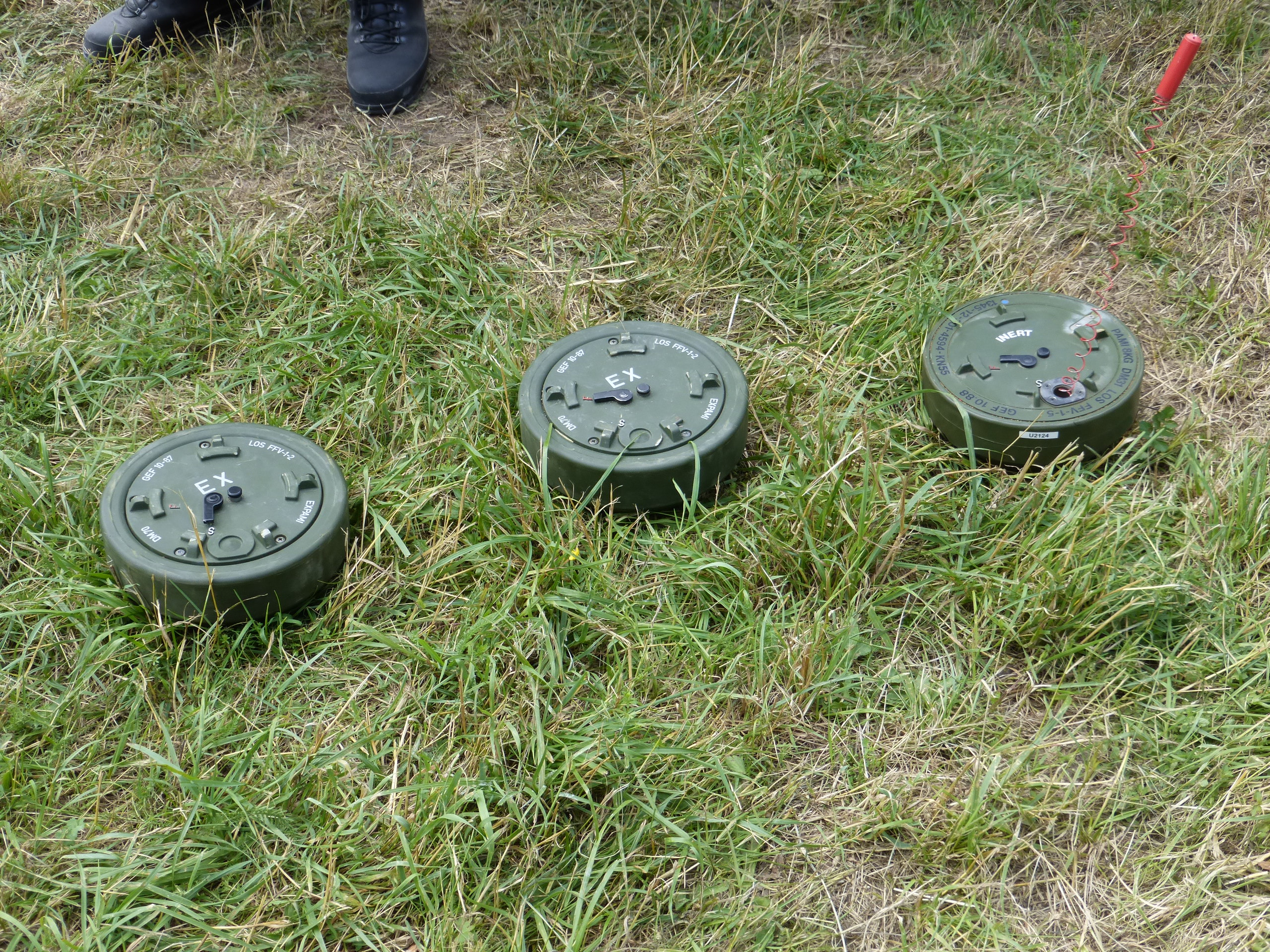
- Inert versions of FFV 028 of the German Bundeswehr
- Type: Anti-tank mine
- Place of origin: Sweden

Production history
- Manufacturer: Saab Bofors Dynamics

The FFV 028 is a series of steel cased Swedish anti-tank mines that use electronic fuzes.

== Design ==
The mines are circular, with a large Misznay Schardin effect warhead in the center of the mine, with the fuzing and sensor electronics located in the dead space above the main charge. The design of the mine dates from the 1970s and uses a magnetic influence sensor to detonate the mine, making it able to attack the full width of armoured vehicles.

The mine can be laid either by hand or by a mechanical mine laying system, capable of laying up to 300 mines per hour. Once the mine is emplaced, a pre-set arming delay of up to 60 minutes is initiated, after which the magnetic sensor activates and will trigger the mine if a target passes overhead. The fuse could be triggered by vehicles as small as a motorbike. The manufacturers stated that the mine was compliant with the 1997 Ottawa Treaty but a 2001 report by Human Rights Watch notes that Canadian Forces database reports that "sweeping a [metal] detector which contains metal components over the mine may cause the FFV 028 to function" which would have put it in contravention of protocol II of the treaty.

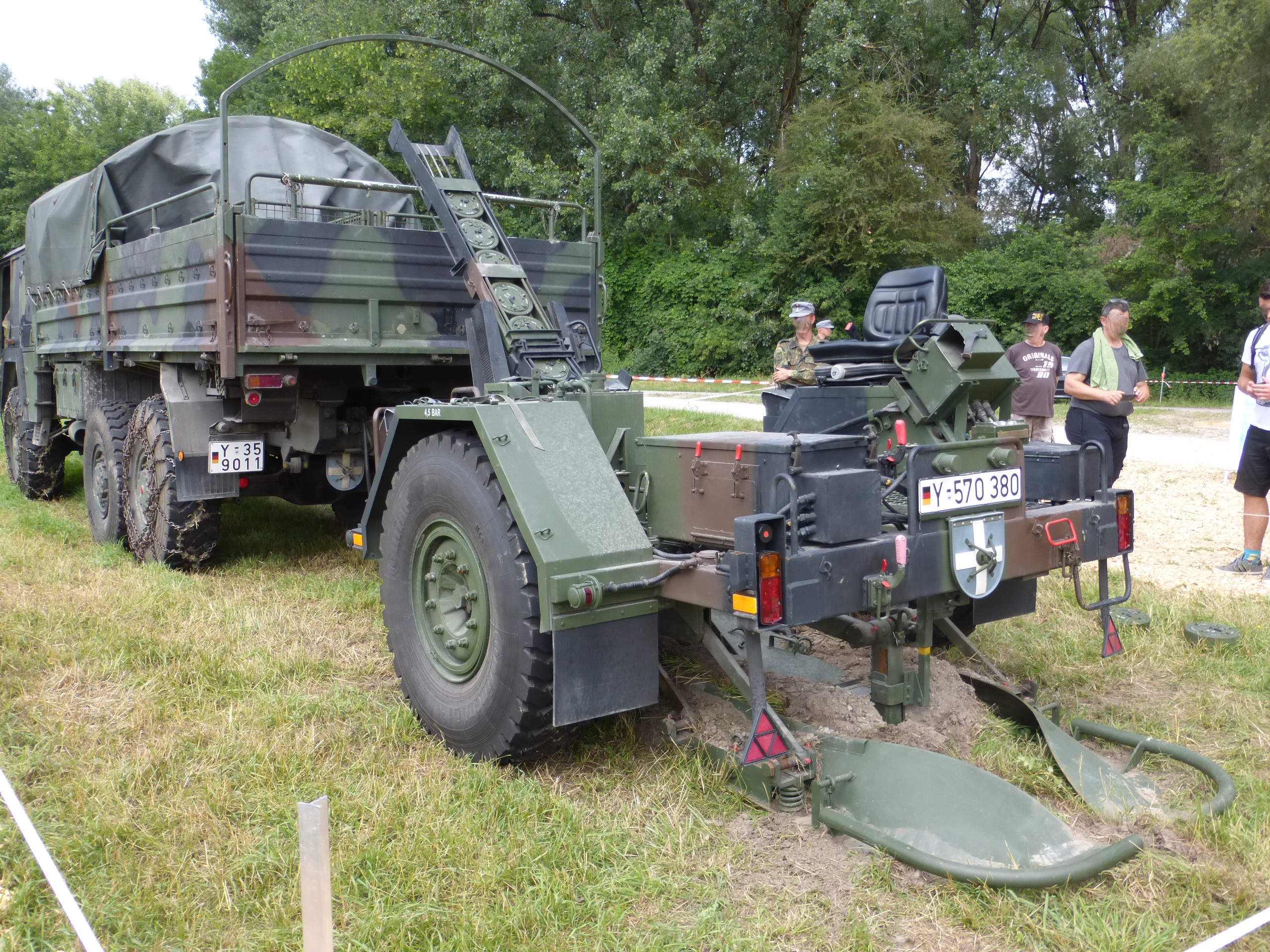
Mine laying system for the FFV 028

When the mine is triggered, a small clearing charge blows away any material that may have been on top of the mine, followed a fraction of a second later by detonation of the main explosive charge.

The main charge creates an explosively formed penetrator which is capable of penetrating the belly armour of any tank currently in existence, and generates substantial secondary blast and fragmentation effects. The mine is blast resistant and has been upgraded to be resistant to advanced demining countermeasures.

== Specifications ==
- Diameter: 260 mm
- Height: 100 mm
- Weight: 9 kg (approx)
- Explosive content: 5 kg (approx) RDX

== Variants ==
=== FFV 028 ===
Pre-production model

=== FFV 028 RU ===
Reusable version of the mine, which can be manually disarmed

=== FFV 028 SD ===
Version fitted with a ball-bearing based anti-handling device. The mine self-destructs after between 30 and 180 days

=== FFV 028 SN ===
Self-neutralizing version of the mine, which disarms itself after 30 to 180 days, indicating its status by launching a red marking cylinder attached to a 0.5 meter long wire.

=== DM 31 ===
German version of the mine.

== Adoption ==
The mine was ordered by the Swedish armed forces in 1982, where it is known as Stridsvagnsmina 6. Subsequently, an order from Germany was placed for 125,000 mines in 1985. The Netherlands placed an order for in excess of 10,000 mines and associated mine laying equipment in 1985, with a second order for additional mines in 1989.

== Users ==
- Germany
- Netherlands
- Sweden
