= TM-35 mine =

Soviet anti-tank mine

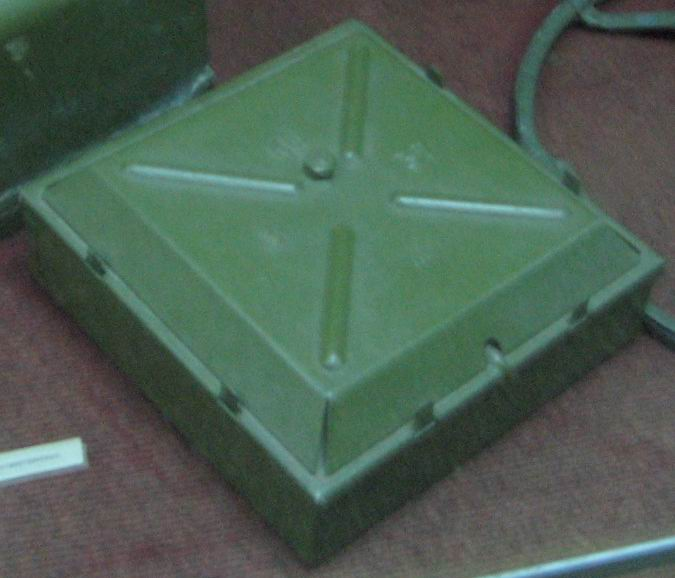
TM-35 at the Museum of Heroic Defense and Liberation of Sevastopol on Sapun Mountain, Sevastopol

The TM-35 was a rectangular, metal-cased Soviet anti-tank mine used during the Second World War. The mine has a metal case, which is rectangular with a carrying handle on one side and a large raised pressure plate in the centre. Sufficient pressure on the central pressure plate presses down on one end of an internal see-saw like lever, which removes the retaining pin from an MUV fuze, releasing the striker, triggering the mine.

The mine's main charge consisted of 200 gram blocks of TNT packed into the metal case.

The mine could be fitted with a number of improvised anti-handling devices utilizing the MUV pull fuze.

== Specifications ==
- Length: 229 mm
- Weight: 5.2 kg
- Explosive content: up to 2.8 kg of TNT
