= Frangibility =

Material that breaks up into parts instead of deforming as one

A material is said to be frangible if through deformation it tends to break up into fragments, rather than deforming elastically and retaining its cohesion as a single object. Common crackers are examples of frangible materials, while fresh bread, which deforms plastically, is not frangible.

A structure is frangible if it breaks, distorts, or yields on impact so as to present a minimum hazard. A frangible structure is usually designed to be of minimum mass.

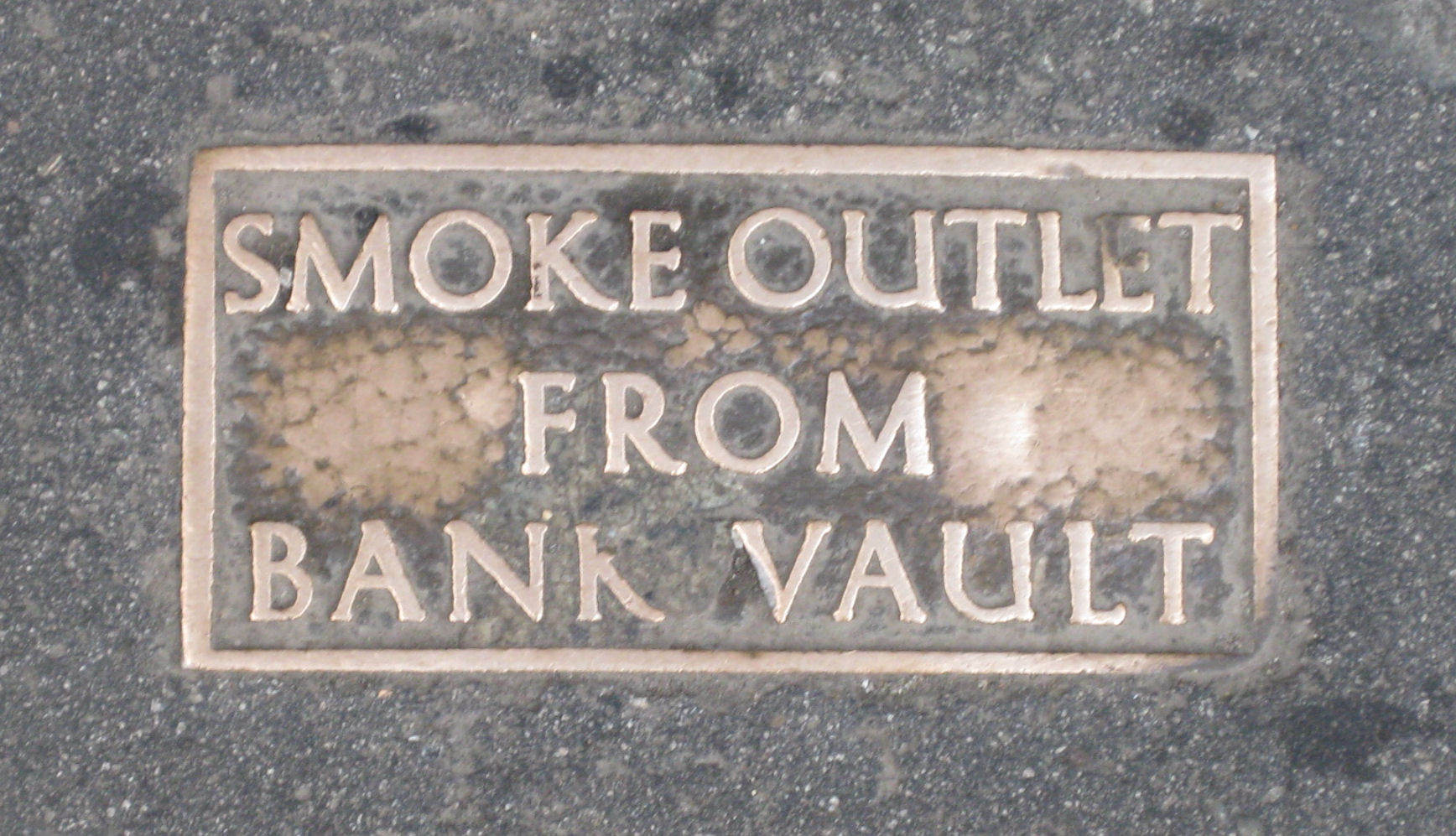
A plaque marking the frangible section of a London pavement, designed to be broken to release smoke in the case of an underground fire

== Light poles ==
A frangible light pole base is designed to break away when a vehicle strikes it. This lessens the risk of injury to occupants of the vehicle.

== Airport structures ==
Following a serious incident where an aircraft hit an approach lighting system structure at San Francisco International airport, the Federal Aviation Administration (FAA) instigated frangible design rules for such structures. A frangible object was defined as "an object of low mass, designed to break, distort or yield on impact, so as to present the minimum hazard to aircraft". This characteristic is seemingly contradictory to the operational requirements for stiffness and rigidity imposed on this type of equipment.

In order to develop international regulation for the frangibility of equipment or installations at airports, required for air navigation purposes (e.g., approach lighting towers, meteorological equipment, radio navigational aids) and their support structures, the International Civil Aviation Organization (ICAO) initiated the "Frangible Aids Study Group" in 1981, with the task to define design requirements, design guidelines and test procedures. This work has resulted in part 6 of the Aerodrome Design Manual, dedicated to frangibility.

An overview of the activities carried out to achieve these results is given in "Frangibility of Approach Lighting Structures at Airports". The missing reference (17) in this article is in "Impact simulation of a frangible approach light structure by an aircraft wing section". With the evolution of numerical methods suitable for impact analysis, a Chapter 6 was added to the Aerodrome Design Manual part 6, dedicated to "numerical simulation methods for evaluating frangibility". It states that numerical methods can be used to evaluate the frangibility of structures, but that the analytical models should still be verified through a series of representative field tests.

Of all equipment or installations at airports required for air navigation purposes, ICAO has not yet formulated frangibility criteria for the tower structure supporting the ILS glide path antenna, "considering its unique nature", basically: its size. A first publication on this subject is given in "Frangible design of instrument landing system/glide slope towers".

== Bullets ==
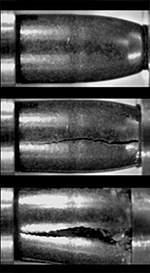
A sequence of photos showing a frangible bullet fracturing when subjected to high velocity strain waves

A frangible bullet is one that is designed to disintegrate into tiny particles upon impact to minimize their penetration for reasons of range safety, to limit environmental impact, or to limit the danger behind the intended target. Examples are the Glaser Safety Slug and the breaching round.

Frangible bullets will disintegrate upon contact with a surface harder than the bullet itself. Frangible bullets are often used by shooters engaging in close quarter combat training to avoid ricochets; targets are placed on steel backing plates that serve to completely fragment the bullet. Frangible bullets are typically made of non-toxic metals, and are frequently used on "green" ranges and outdoor ranges where lead abatement is a concern.

== Glass ==
Tempered glass is said to be frangible when it fractures and breaks into many small pieces.

== Other ==
Some security tapes and labels are intentionally weak or have brittle components. The intent is to deter tampering by making it almost impossible to remove intact.

In 2024, Aspen Cooling Osberton International Horse Trials cross-country course started using frangible trakehner fences to allow the wooden fence to give way in order to prevent a horse from falling.

== See also ==
- Friability
- Sacrificial part
- Spall
