= Flachmine 17 =

War apparatus during First World War

The Flachmine 17 was a German anti-tank landmine mass-produced during the First World War. Production of the mine began in 1916 after the appearance of British and French tanks, and over three million had been produced by the end of the war. The mine consisted of a simple wooden box containing a main charge with four spring percussion detonators at the top which would trigger when driven over by a heavy vehicle such as a tank. It was also possible to wire the mine for manual remote detonation.

== Specifications ==
- Weight: 12 lbs (4.6 kg)
- Explosive content: 18 standard 200 g blocks of demolition explosive
- Length: 10 cm
- Width: 80 cm
- Height: 3 cm
- Operating pressure: 12,000mps
