= T-AB-1 AP mine =

Anti-personnel mine

The T-AB-1 or MAP NM T-AB-1 (Mina Anti-Pessoal Nāo-Magnética) is a small, cylindrical, fully waterproof and shock-resistant Brazilian minimum metal anti-personnel mine. The mine is normally olive green in color, and uses the AC Min NM AE T-AB-1 pressure fuze. It is no longer in production, ceased in 1989, and all operational stocks have been destroyed. The mine is operational in Ecuador and Libya.

This mine was used as the initiator for the T-AB-1 anti-tank mine.

A grey practice version of the mine is also produced.

== Specifications ==
- Diameter: 60 mm
- Height: 61 mm
- Weight: 125 g
- Explosive content: 62 g of Pentolite
- Operating pressure: 18 kg
