= Riegel mine 43 =

German anti-tank bar mine

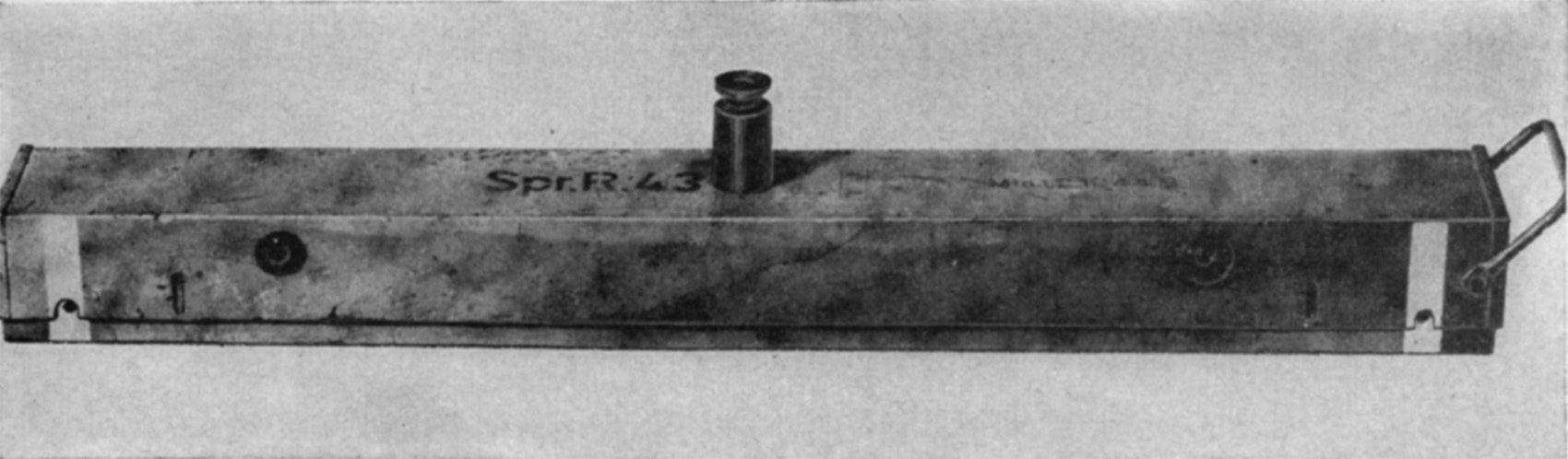
A Riegelmine 43

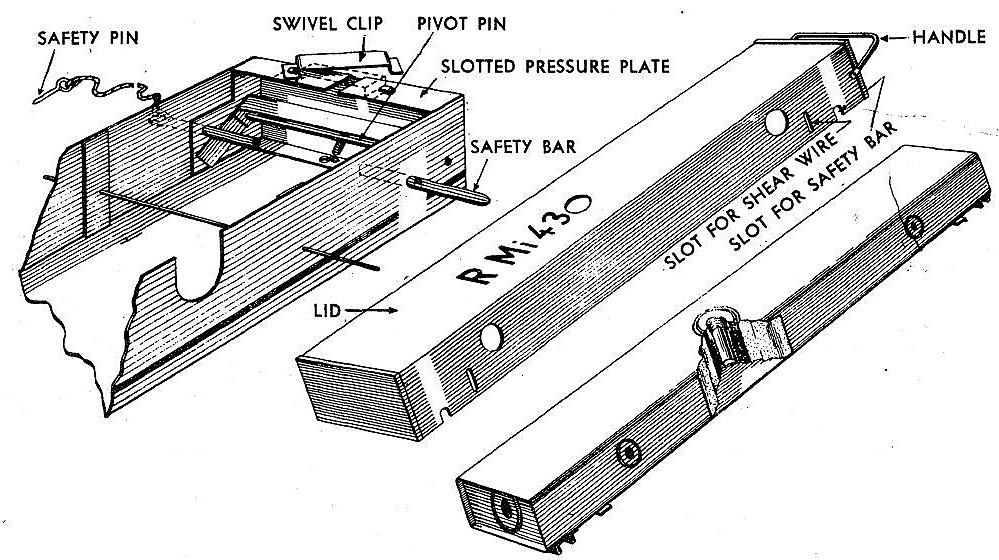
Riegelmine 43 schematic

The Riegel mine 43 or (Sprengriegel/R.Mi. 43) is a German steel cased anti-tank bar mine used during the Second World War. The mine is a long thin rectangle. It consists of a lower and upper metal tray, and an internal metal-cased explosive block. It uses two ZZ42 fuzes inserted into either end of the internal block, although it can be used with an additional pressure fuze on the top. The mine is similar to the Italian B-2 mine. A variant, the Riegel mine 44 was also produced with a different fuze. Approximately 3,051,400 were produced between 1943 and 1945.

Attempting to disarm Riegelmines is extremely dangerous because the metal wires in the fuze mechanisms quickly become corroded, which makes them highly unstable. As a result, Riegelmines are highly sensitive to the smallest disturbance, and therefore can easily detonate simply by touching them. The situation is further complicated by the fact that Riegel mines can be fitted with up to three anti-handling devices. The recommended render-safe procedure for any Riegel mine is to destroy it in situ by detonating a small explosive charge next to it.

Countries where Riegel mines were laid include the Netherlands, Egypt and Libya.

== Specifications ==
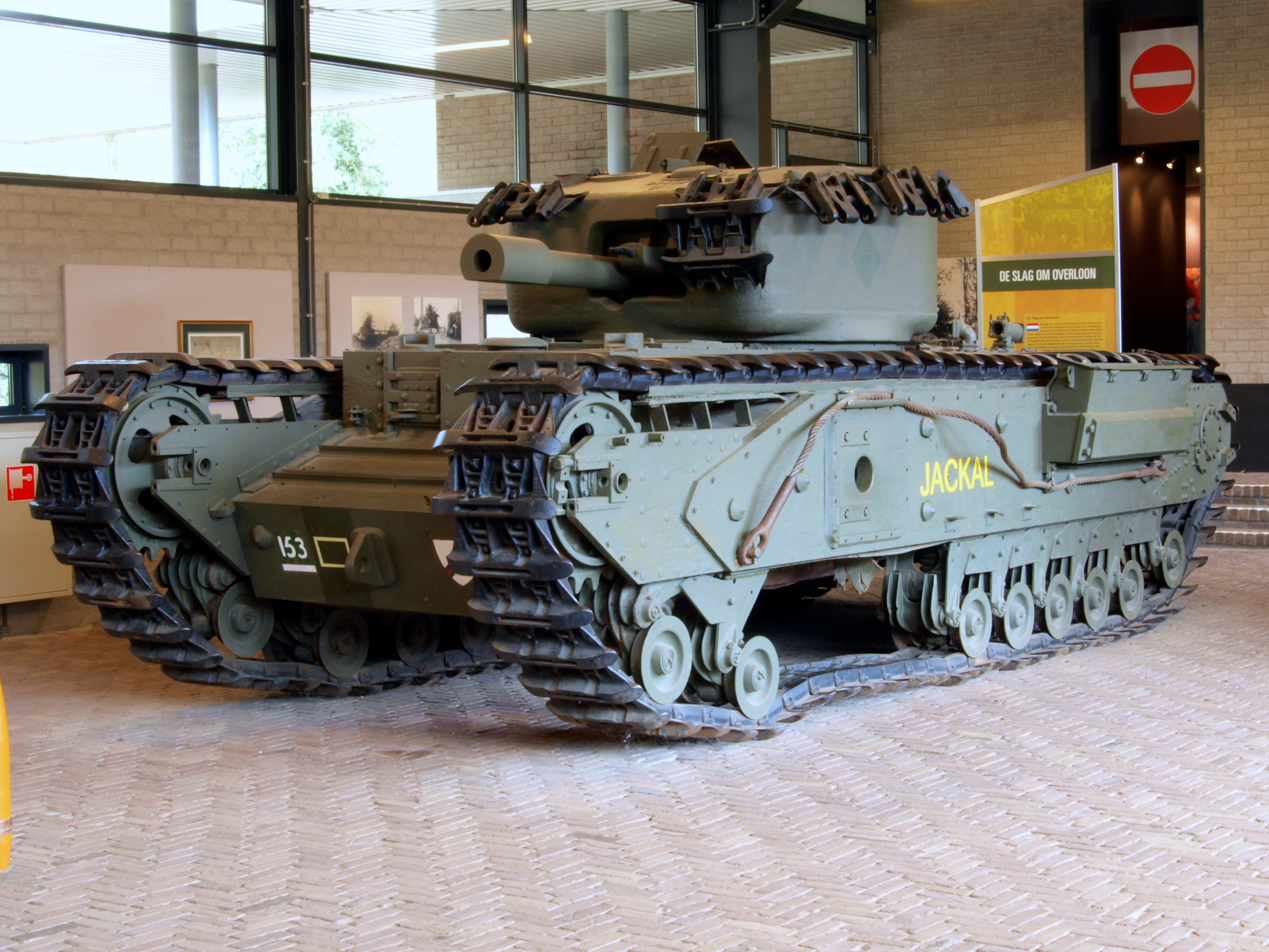
Churchill Mk V tank destroyed by a Riegelmine in the Overloon War Museum, in addition to the obvious damage to the suspension the mine penetrated the hull killing two of the crew

- Weight: 9.3 kg (20 lb 8 oz)
- Explosive content: 4 kg (8 lb 13 oz) of TNT
- Length: 80 cm (31 in)
- Width: 95 mm (3.7 in)
- Height: 12 cm (4.7 in)
- Operating pressure: Variable - 360 kg (790 lb) at the center, 180 kg (400 lb) at the ends.
