= Topfmine =

German anti-tank mine

Anti-tank blast mine
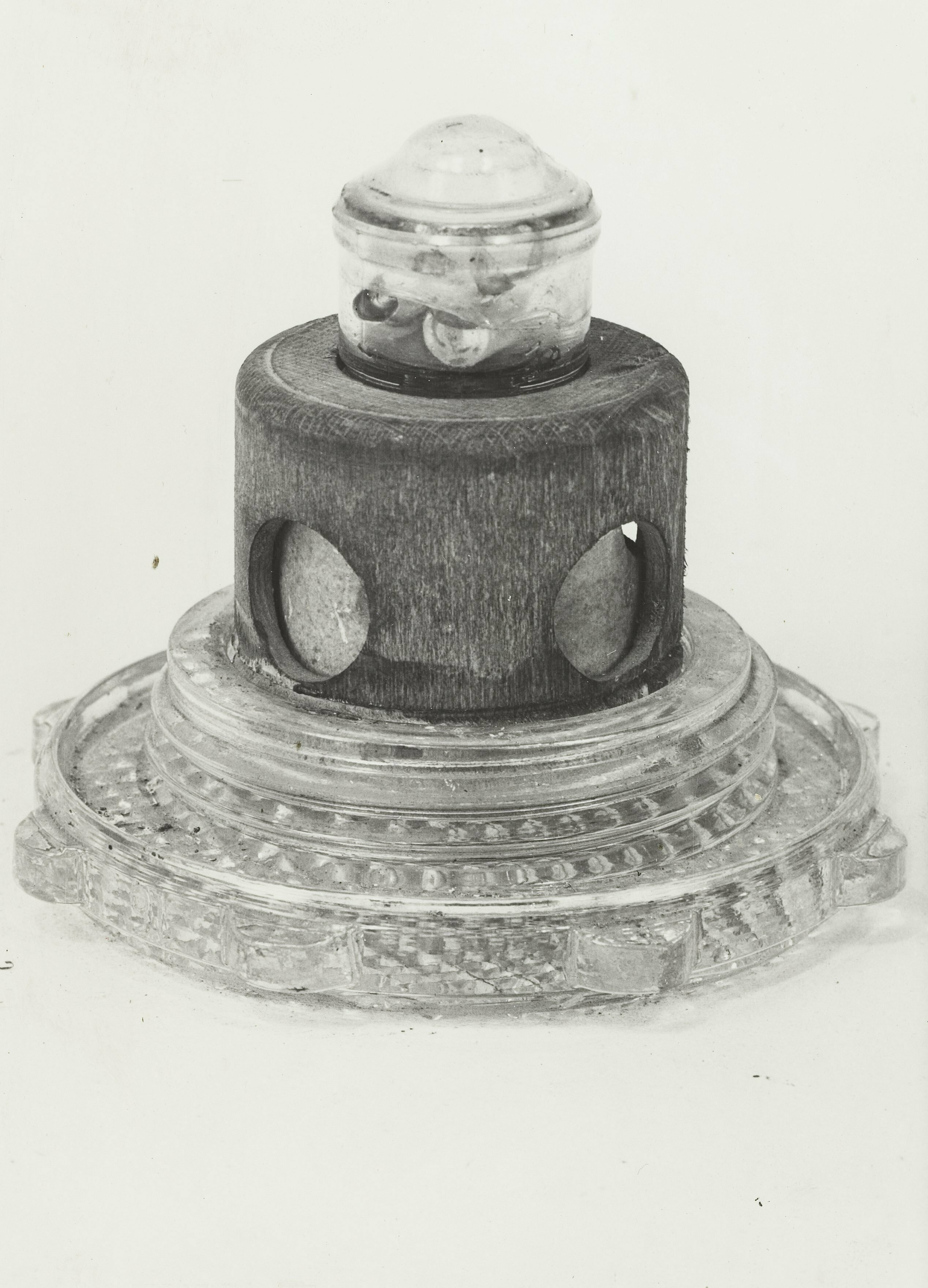
- Topfmine C
- Type: Mine
- Place of origin: Germany

Service history
- Wars: World War II

The Topfmines (German: "pot mines") were a series of German circular minimum-metal anti-tank blast mines that entered service with the German army in 1944, during the Second World War.

The mines used a case made of compressed wood pulp, cardboard, and tar along with glass plugs and components designed to be undetectable by Allied mine detectors. Often the only metallic part of the mines was the detonator.

To enable the mines to be found by friendly forces, the mines were painted with a black sandy substance called Tarnsand (camouflage sand). Allied forces found that although the mines were undetectable by Allied mine detectors, German mine detectors could find the mines when they had been marked with Tarnsand. The secret of Tarnsand was maintained until after the end of the war, when it was discovered that it was a mildly radioactive substance and the German mine detectors incorporated a simple Geiger counter.

== Topfmine A ==
The Topfmine A had a flattened dome-shaped case with a raised flat circular pressure plate on the top surface surrounded by a circular shear groove. The case was normally made from pulped wood and cardboard mixed with tar for waterproofing. However, sometimes the case was made from bituminous coal waste. The SF 1 fuze was inserted into the underside of the mine and was placed inside a large glass plug which sealed the bottom of the mine. A secondary fuze well was provided on the bottom of this plug for installing anti-handling devices. The SF 1 fuze was constructed of glass and wood and contained a detonator and booster charge.

Force of approximately 330 pounds (150 kg) on the pressure plate caused the plate to shear off from the mine casing, collapsing down on the glass head of the pressure fuze. The glass head was driven downwards, crushing two glass vials of chemicals, which reacted together causing a flash, initiating the detonator, booster, and finally the main charge of TNT.

Two versions of the mine were produced – a fully waterproofed version designated "To.Mi.A4531" and the normal "To.Mi.4531".

== Topfmine B ==
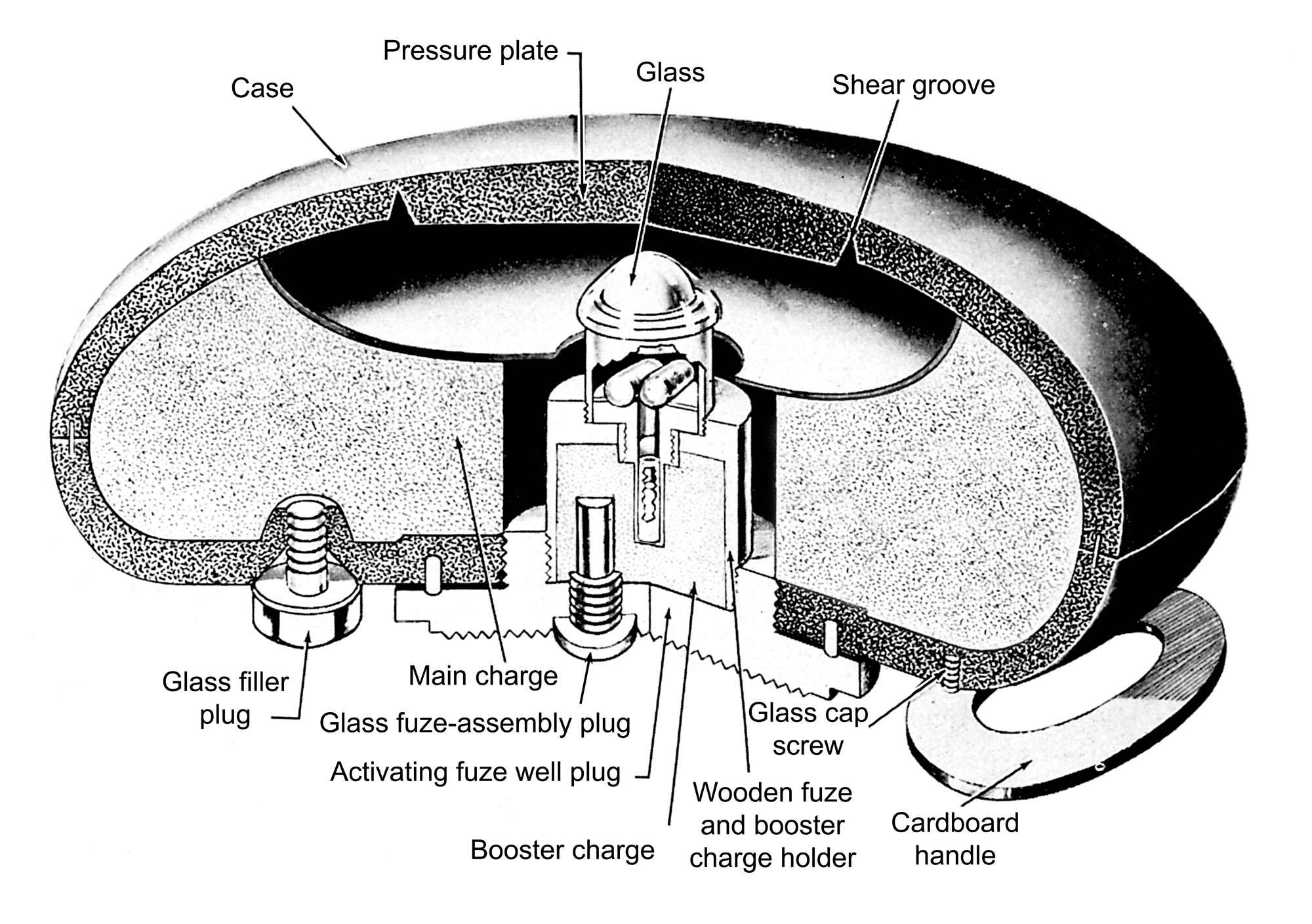
Topfmine B

The Topfmine B (To.Mi.B4531) was broadly similar to the "A" version, the principal difference being a smooth case without a raised pressure plate. This version instead had an internal shear groove to prevent water from working its way into the mine and possibly deactivating it.

== Topfmine C ==
The Topfmine C (To.Mi.C4531 or Pappmine) changed the design to an eight-sided flattened cylinder shape, with a central glass fuze plug on the top. This design was very thin-walled, and sympathetic detonation could occur if the mines were planted closer together than seven feet (2.1 m).

== Specifications ==
	Topfmine A	Topfmine B	Topfmine C
Diameter	33 cm (1 ft 1 in)	32 cm (1 ft 1 in)	34 cm (1 ft 1 in)
Height	140 mm (5.5 in)		
Weight	9.5 kg (20 lb 15 oz)	10 kg (22 lb 1 oz)	9 kg (19 lb 13 oz)
Explosive content	6 kg (13 lb 4 oz)		
Operating pressure	150 kg (330 lb)		
