= Tellermine 35 =

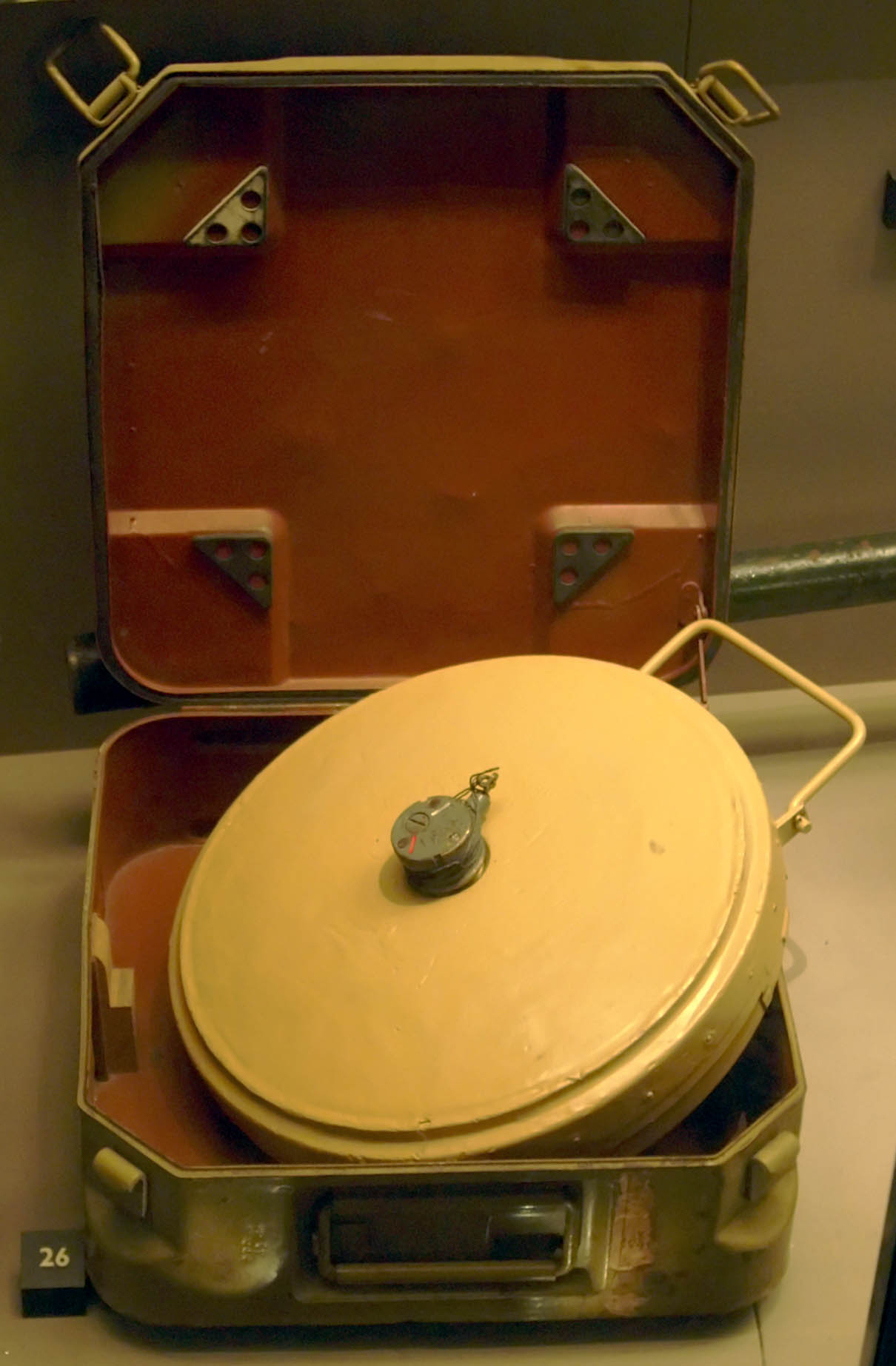
- A pre-war Tellermine 35 in a carry case at the Imperial War Museum in London. The fuze is visible in the centre of the mine
- Type: anti-tank mine

Service history
- In service: 1935–1945
- Used by: Germany,
- Wars: World War II

Specifications
- Mass: 9.1 kg (20 lb 1 oz)
- Height: 76 mm (3 in)
- Diameter: 31.8 cm (12.5 in)
- Filling: TNT
- Filling weight: 5.5 kg (12 lb 2 oz)
- Detonation mechanism: Pressure - weight of 91 to 181 kilograms (200 to 400 lb)

The Tellermine 35 (T.Mi.35) was a German metal-cased anti-tank mine used extensively during the Second World War. The mine's case is made of sheet steel, and has a slightly convex pressure plate on the top surface with a central fuze well. Two secondary fuze wells are located on the side and bottom of the mine for anti-handling devices.

For use on beaches and underwater the mine could be deployed inside a specially designed earthenware or concrete pot, which acted as a waterproof jacket for the mine.

A later variant of the mine, the T.Mi.35 (S) was produced with a ribbed case and a fuze cover. The ribbed case stopped sand from blowing off the top of the mine when it was used in a desert or sandy environment.

Pressure of 400 pounds (180 kg) on the center of the mine or 200 pounds (91 kg) on its edge deforms the pressure plate compressing a spring, and breaking a shear pin which holds back the spring-loaded striker. Once the striker is released it flips downwards into a percussion cap which fires the adjacent detonator followed by the booster charge and then the main explosive filling of TNT. Most were painted field gray. From 1943, they were painted dark yellow.

Finland used Tellermine 35s under the designation PANSSARIMIINA m/41.

== Bibliography ==
- Jane's Mines and Mine Clearance 2005-2006
- TM 5–223, Foreign Mine Warfare Equipment
- TM-E 30-451, Handbook on German Military Forces, March 1945
