= Shear pin =

Type of mechanical component

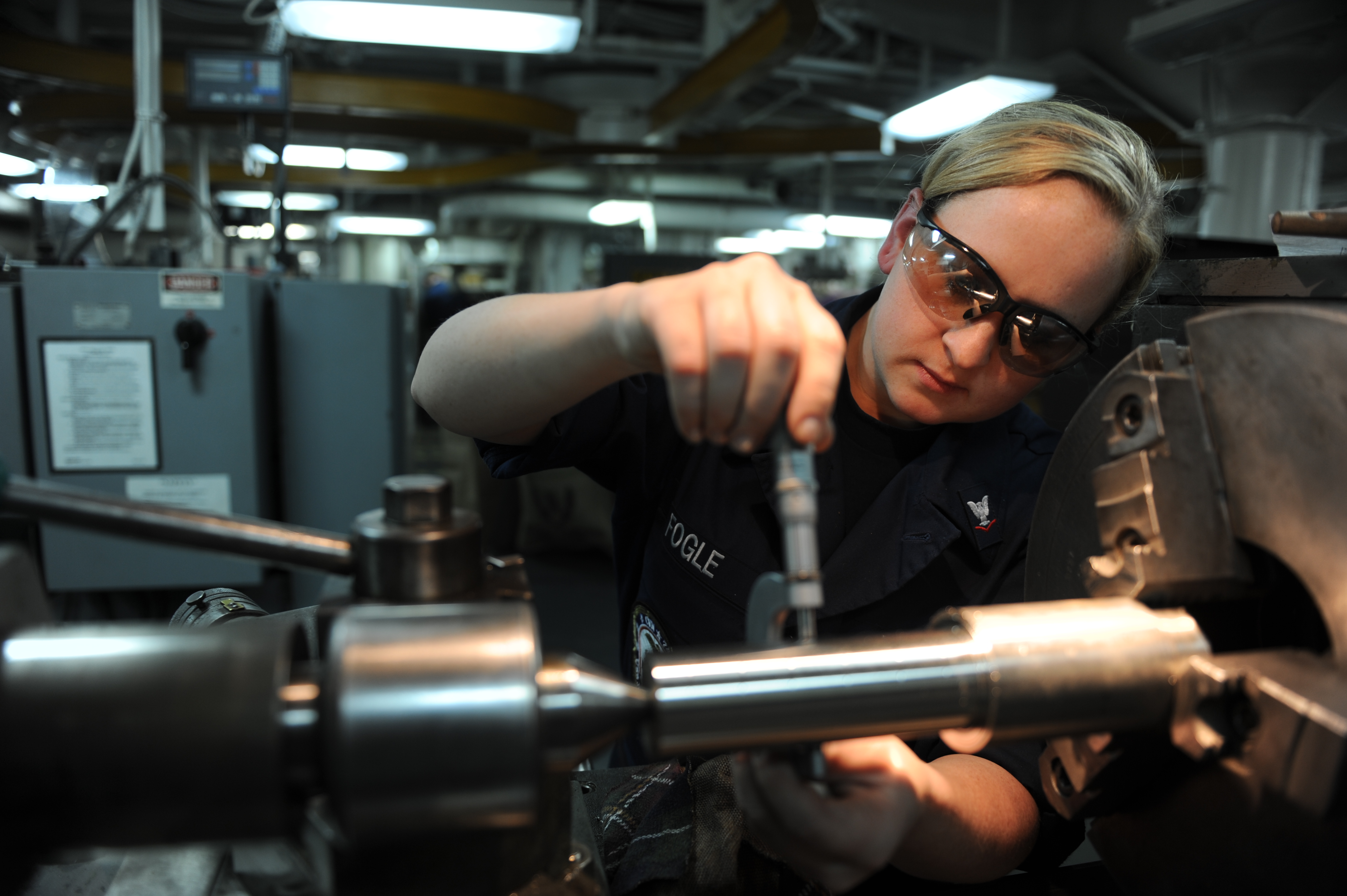
A sailor checks the outside diameter of a shear pin in the machinery repair shop aboard US aircraft carrier John C. Stennis.

A shear pin is a mechanical detail designed to allow a specific outcome to occur once a predetermined force is applied. It can either function as a safeguard designed to break to protect other parts, or as a conditional operator that will not allow a mechanical device to operate until the correct force is applied.

== As safeguards ==
In the role of a mechanical safeguard, a shear pin is a safety device designed to shear in the case of a mechanical overload, preventing other, more expensive or less-easily replaced parts from being damaged. As a mechanical sacrificial part, it is analogous to an electric fuse.

They are most commonly used in drive trains, such as a snow blower's auger or the propellers attached to marine engines. In airplanes, in the framing connecting an engine to the wing from which it is suspended, hollow fuse pins may be incorporated. These allow the engine to separate from the wing under extreme loading events that otherwise might cause the wing's fuel tanks to rupture.

Another use is in pushback bars used for large aircraft. In this device, shear pins are frequently used to connect the "head" of the towbar – the portion that attaches to the aircraft – to the main shaft of the towbar. In this way, the failure of the shear pin will physically separate the aircraft and the tractor. The design may be such that the shear pin will have several different causes of failure – towbar rotation about its long axis, sudden braking or acceleration, excessive steering force, etc. – all of which could otherwise be extremely damaging to the aircraft.

== As conditional operators ==
In the role as a conditional operator, a shear pin will be used to prevent a mechanical device from operating before the criteria for operation are met. A shear pin gives a distinct threshold for the force required for operation. It is very cheap and easy to produce delivering a very high reliability and predictable tolerance. They are almost maintenance-free and can remain ready for operation for years with little to no decrease in reliability. Shear pins are only useful for a single operating cycle, after each operation they have to be replaced. A common example is the plastic or wire loop securing the pin to the handles of common fire extinguishers. The presence of the pin prevents accidental discharge by only allowing the handle to be depressed once the pin is removed. The loop prevents the inadvertent removal of the pin, which could otherwise easily fall out. A significant amount of force is applied to the plastic or wire loop; by breaking, it allows the pin to subsequently be removed, thus allowing the handles to be depressed, discharging the fire extinguisher.

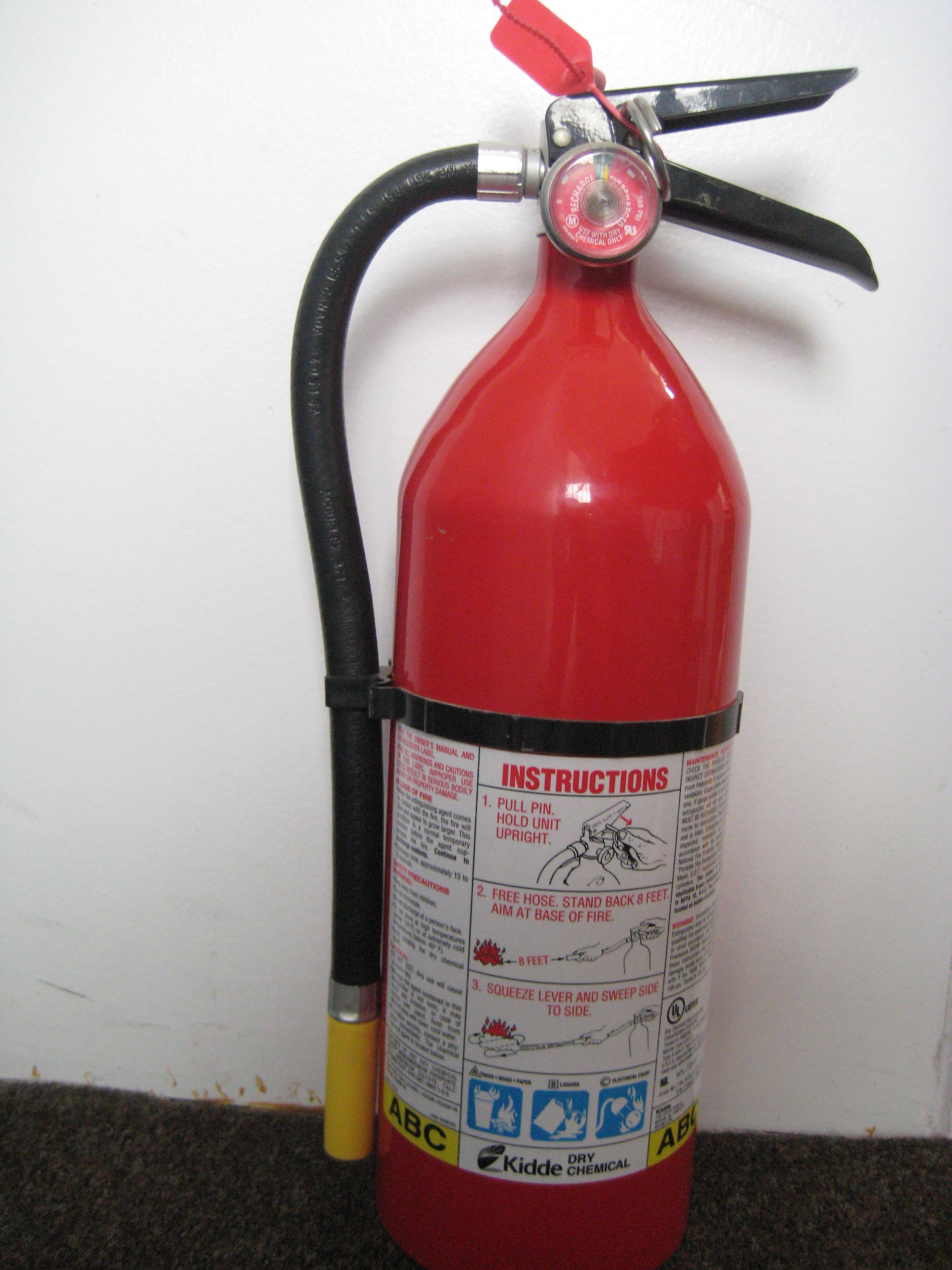
The red plastic loop secures the pull pin to the handles.

Many designs take advantage of the maintenance-free state of constant readiness. For example, a hydraulic damper protecting a structure from earthquake damage could be secured with a shear pin. During normal conditions the system would be completely rigid, but when acted upon by the force of an earthquake the shear pin would break and the hydraulic damping system would operate.

Their high reliability and low cost make them very popular for use in weapons. A typical example is using shear pins in an explosive device. A shear pin can hold a striker pin in place, preventing the striker pin from striking an initiator (primer) unless the correct force is applied; that force can be the acceleration of a rifle grenade being launched. The force would snap the shear pin, allowing the striker pin to move backwards onto a primer, which in turn ignites a pyrotechnic delay composition for auto destruction. In this use, shear pins prevent the striker pin from hitting the primer during handling, or if the grenade was dropped by accident. Additionally, shear-pins are frequently used in anti-tank mine fuzes to prevent them from being triggered by much lighter, non-target vehicles, such as motorcycles. Typically, the shear-pin in an anti-tank mine is designed to snap (and release the spring-loaded firing pin) when a weight in excess of 1500 kilograms is applied to the pressure plate.

== Material ==
A shear pin could potentially be made from any material, although metal is the most common.

When making a metal object for a mechanical application, an alloy is usually selected to make the construction resistant to damage. This can, for example, be achieved by giving the material a high degree of elasticity, so that like a spring, the metal returns to its original shape after being deformed by an external force. A shear pin, however, is often tempered to make the metal brittle, so that it breaks or shatters, rather than bends when the required force is applied.

The material of a shear pin is selected and treated so that it is relatively resistant to fatigue. If material fatigue were to weaken a shear pin, the pin could potentially be broken by a force smaller than the original threshold force, causing the mechanism to operate unintentionally, or allow a safety shear pin to break during normal operation of the machinery it protects.

== Construction ==
The pin itself may be as simple as a metal rod that is inserted into a channel and drilled through two moving parts, locking them in place as long as the pin is intact.

It may also be a plain metal rod inserted through a hub and axle; the diameter of the rod, alloy, and tempering of the metal are all carefully chosen to allow the pin to shear when the predetermined threshold force or shock is reached.

A split pin (cotter pin in American usage) can also be used as a shear pin.

== See also ==
- Bolted joint
- Torque limiter
