= Type 72 non-metallic anti-tank mine =

Type 72 Non-Metallic is a Chinese circular, plastic bodied landmine which is designed to damage or destroy a vehicle by blast effect.

== Mechanism ==
The mine has a slightly domed pressure plate made from flexible plastic with a raised 6 spoke wagon wheel pattern on top. Type 72 has a telescopic carrying handle molded into the bottom of the mine and a large diameter filler plug on the side just above the handle position. The mine has a crimp around the top edge where the mine body meets the pressure plate. The mine contains 5.4 kg of 50:50 RDX/TNT and is actuated when pressure of 300 kg deforms the flexible plastic pressure plate long enough to release the cocked striker fuze. When the pressure plate is moved approximately 9 mm downwards it exerts pressure on the fuze. If fuzed with the T-72 clear plastic-cased blast resistant fuze, pressure on the top of the fuze will depress the casing which will revolve due to the depression of the spring which is attached to the casing. The revolution is controlled by lugs on the inner fuze assembly which fit in grooves in the fuze casing. When the fuze casing is revolved and depressed sufficiently, the two retaining balls to will fall away in groove in the outer casing, which releases the striker. The striker is driven down by the spring, initiating the detonator, which in turn initiates the booster and the main charge. The mine is blast resistant since rapid depression of the fuze will push the fuze casing straight down without any revolution. The lugs on the inner fuze assembly will then slide into vertical groves instead of the diagonal ones. The striker retaining balls will then be prevented from coming in line with the groves in the outer casing and the striker will not be released. Instead the pressure plate will bounce back into its original position.

== Similar Landmines ==
Two similar plastic bodied AT mines manufactured in China are the Type 69 and the Type 81, although it is entirely possible that there is no difference between the Type 69, Type 72 and Type 81 mines other than their fuzes. The basic descriptions (dimensions, weights, appearance, colour) for Type 69 and Type 81 mines match the Type 72 very closely. The fuzes are all blast resistant and the mine name may only vary depending on the fuze used. Type 69 features a fuze that takes two depressions to trigger, but this feature was removed from the Type 72, being replaced by a delay mechanism. Type 85 differs from the Type 72 by being packaged with the fuze.

Because of its low metal content, the Type 72 cannot be located using metal detectors under most field conditions. The Type 72 is resistant to shock and overpressure from explosive breaching systems such as the Giant Viper and MICLIC. It is likewise resistant to the PLA's own GSL111 explosive breaching system.

China also makes a metal-cased version called the Type 72 iron-shelled anti-tank mine (72式铁壳反坦克地雷). There is also a steel-springed version of the iron-shelled mine, 72式钢簧铁壳地雷.

A copy of the mine, the YM-III (sometimes YM-3), is produced in Iran. It is slightly heavier at 7 kg, with a slightly heavier 5.7 kg Composition B main charge, with a slightly higher activation pressure of 450 to 900 kg. Additionally, a copy is produced in South Africa as "Non-metallic anti-tank mine".

== Specifications ==
- Weight: 6.5 kg
- Explosive content: 5.4 kg of TNT/RDX in a 50/50 mix
- Diameter: 270 mm
- Height: 100 mm
- Operating pressure: 300 to 800 kg

== Countries found in ==
- Angola
- Bosnia Herzegovina
- Cambodia
- China
- Eritrea
- Ethiopia
- Iraq
- Jordan
- Lebanon
- Mozambique
- Rwanda
- Somalia
- South Africa
- Sudan
- Uganda
- Zambia
