= Anti-tank mine =

Type of land mine designed to destroy tanks

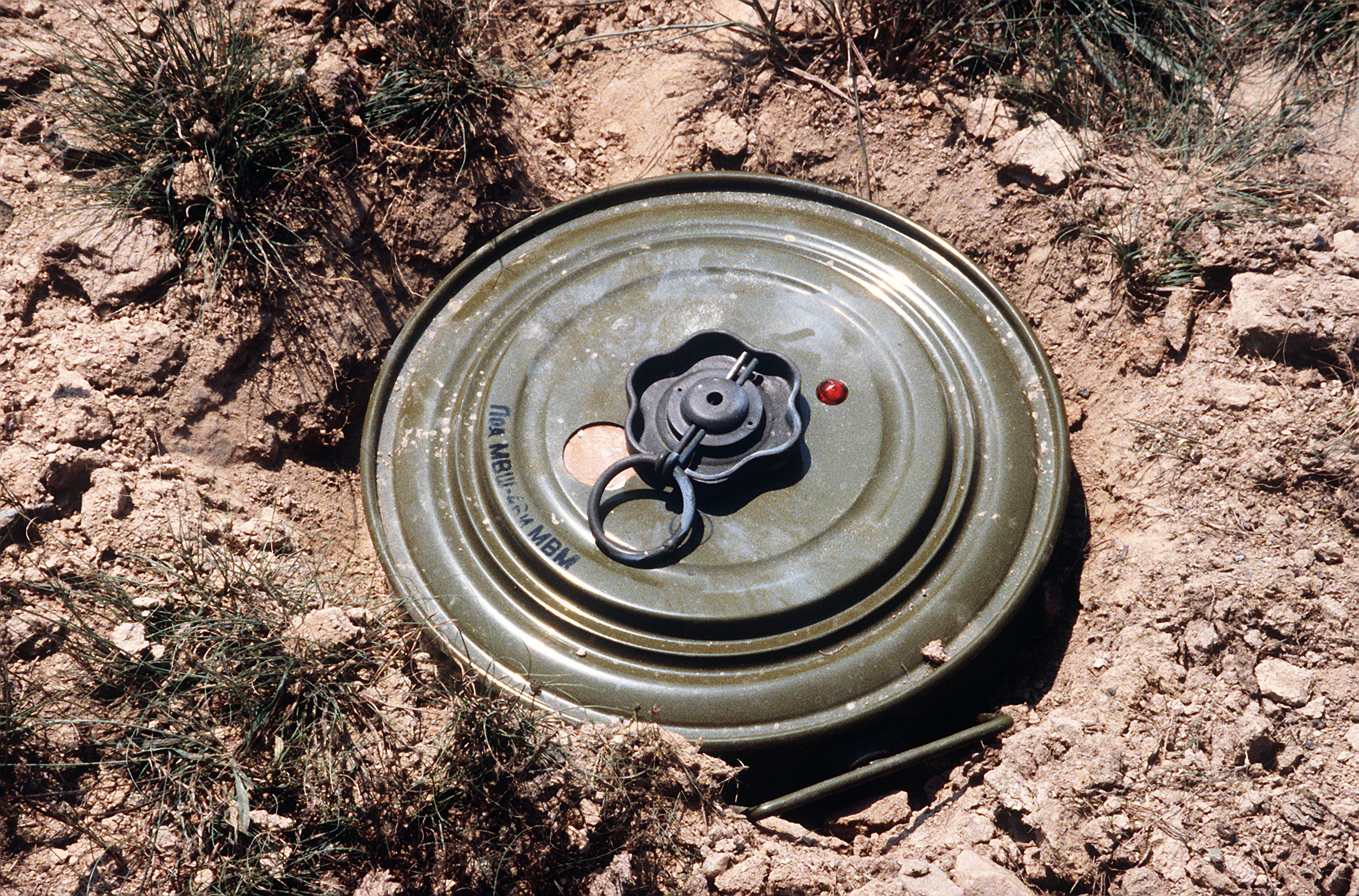
A Russian TM-46 anti-tank blast mine

An anti-tank or AT mine is a type of land mine designed to damage or destroy vehicles, including tanks and armored fighting vehicles.

Compared to anti-personnel mines, anti-tank mines typically have a much larger explosive charge, and a fuze designed to be triggered by vehicles or, in some cases, remotely or by tampering with the mine.

== History ==
=== First World War ===
The first anti-tank mines were improvised during the First World War as a countermeasure against the first tanks introduced by the British towards the end of the war. Initially they were nothing more than a buried high-explosive shell or mortar bomb with its fuze upright. Later, purpose-built mines were developed, including the Flachmine 17, which was simply a wooden box packed with explosives and triggered either remotely or by a pressure fuze. By the end of the war, the Germans had developed row-mining techniques, and mines accounted for 15% of US tank casualties during the Battle of Saint-Mihiel, Third Battle of the Aisne, Battle of Selle, and Meuse-Argonne Offensive.

=== Inter-War Period ===
The Soviet Union began developing mines in the early 1920s, and in 1924 produced its first anti-tank mine, the EZ mine. The mine, which was developed by Yegorov and Zelinskiy, had a 1 kg charge, which was enough to break the tracks of contemporary tanks. Meanwhile, in Germany, defeat spurred the development of anti-tank mines, with the first truly modern mine, the Tellermine 29, entering service in 1929. It was a disc-shaped device approximately 30 cm across filled with about 5 kg of high explosives. A second mine, the Tellermine 35 was developed in 1935. Anti-tank mines were used by both sides during the Spanish Civil War. Notably, Republican forces lifted mines placed by Nationalist forces and used them against the Nationalists. This spurred the development of anti-handling devices for anti-tank mines.

The Winter War between the Soviet Union and Finland also saw widespread use of anti-tank mines. Finnish forces, facing a general shortage of anti-tank weapons, could exploit the predictable movements of motorized units imposed by difficult terrain and weather conditions.

=== Second World War ===
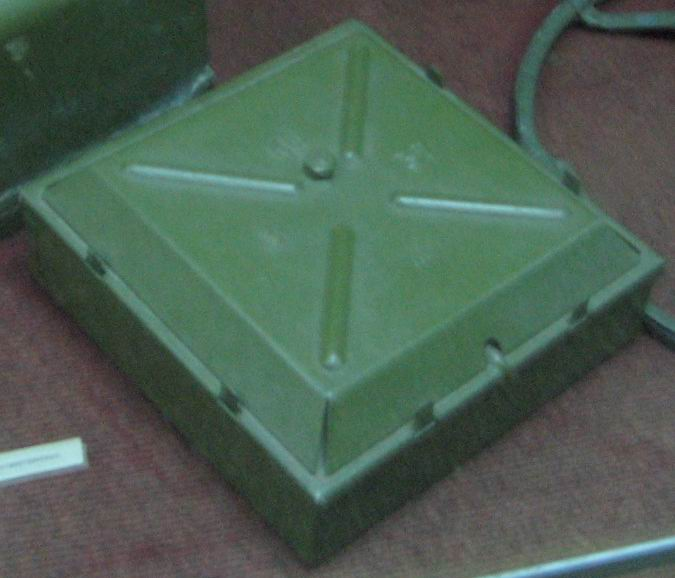
Soviet TM-35 mine at the Museum of Heroic Defense and Liberation of Sevastopol on Sapun Mountain, Sevastopol

The German Tellermine was a purpose-built anti-tank mine first introduced in 1929. Some variants were of a rectangular shape, but in all cases, the outer casing served only as container for the explosives and fuze, without being used to destructive effect (e.g. shrapnel). Tellermine was the prototypical anti-tank mine, with many elements of its design emulated by later mines such as the Pignone P-1, NR 25, and M6. Because of the Tellermine's high operating pressure, a vehicle would need to pass directly overhead to detonate it. But since the tracks represent only about 20% of a tank's width, the pressure fuze had a limited area of effect.

As one source has it:

Since they were pressure-detonated, these early anti-tank mines typically did most of their damage to a tank's treads, leaving its crew unharmed and its guns still operational but immobilised and vulnerable to aircraft and enemy anti-tank weapons ... During World War II they (the Wehrmacht) began using a mine with a tilt-rod fuze, a thin rod standing approximately two feet up from the center of the charge and nearly impossible to see after the mine had been buried. As a tank passed over the mine, the rod was pushed forward, causing the charge to detonate directly beneath it. The blast often killed the crew and sometimes exploded onboard ammunition. Now that tank crews were directly at risk, they were less likely to plow through a minefield.

Although other measures such as satchel charges, sticky bombs, and bombs designed to magnetically adhere to tanks were developed, they do not fall within the category of land mines as they are not buried and detonated remotely or by pressure. The Hawkins mine was a British anti-tank device that could be employed as a mine laid on the road surface for a tank to run over, setting off a crush fuze or thrown at the tank in which case a timer fuze was used.

Shaped-charge devices like the Hohl-Sprung mine 4672 were also developed by Germany later in the war, although these did not see widespread use. The most advanced German anti-tank mine of the war was their minimal-metal Topfmine.

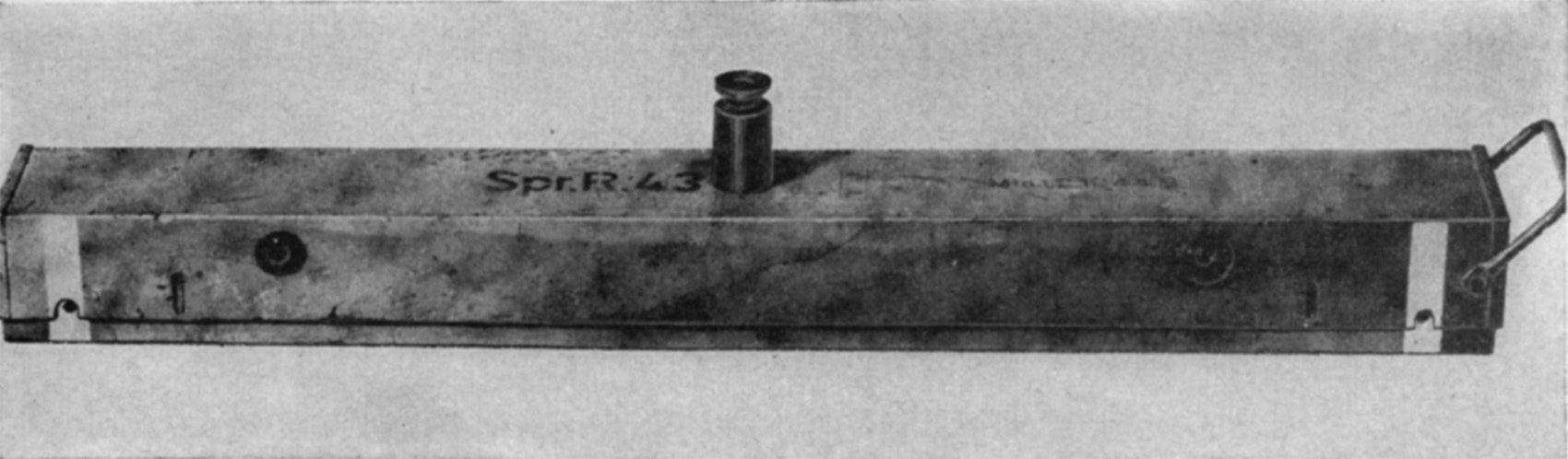
German Riegel mine 43

In contrast to the dinner plate mines such as the German Tellermine were bar mines such as the German Riegel mine 43 and Italian B-2 mine. These were long mines designed to increase the probability of a vehicle triggering it; the B-2 consisted of multiple small shaped charge explosive charges along its length designed to ensure a mobility kill against enemy vehicles by destroying their tracks. This form of mine was the inspiration for the British L9 bar mine.

=== Modern ===
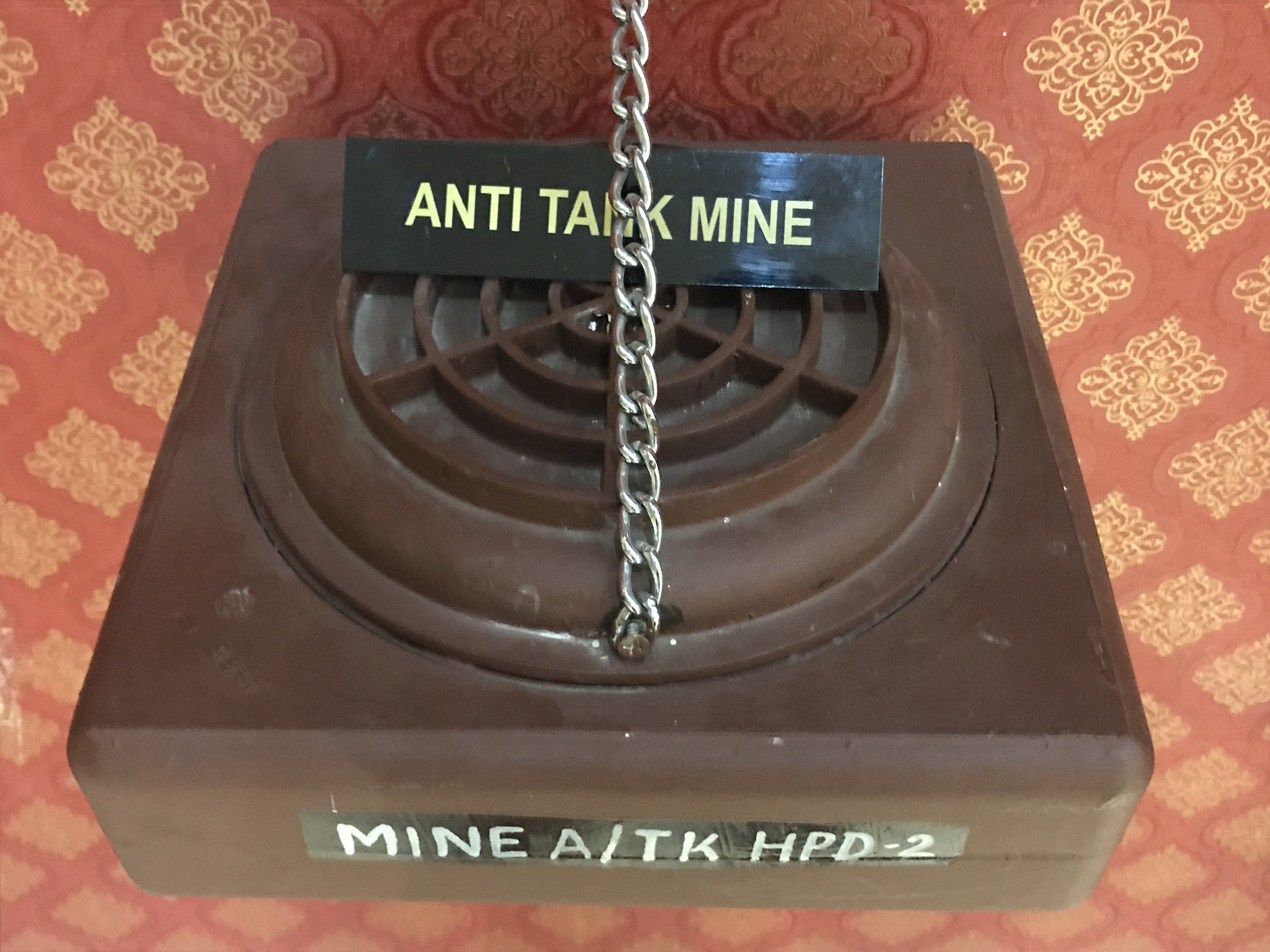
Anti-tank mine used by the Indian Army

Several advances have been made in the development of modern anti-tank mines, including:

- more effective explosive payloads (different explosive compounds and shaped charge effects),
- use of non-ferrous materials, making them harder to detect,
- new methods of deployment (from aircraft or with artillery),
- more sophisticated fuzes (e.g. triggered by magnetic and seismic effects, which make a mine blast-resistant, or which ignore the first target vehicle to drive over it and therefore can be used against convoys or mine rollers), and
- sophisticated "anti-handling" devices to prevent or discourage tampering or removal.

== Design ==
More modern anti-tank mines are usually more advanced than simple containers full of explosives detonated by remote or the vehicle's pressure. The biggest advances were made in the following areas:

- Power of the explosives (explosives such as RDX).
- Shaped charges to increase the armour piercing effect.
- Advanced dispersal systems.
- More advanced or specific detonation triggers.

Most modern mine bodies or casings are made of plastic to avoid easy detection. They feature combinations of pressure- or magnetically-activated detonators to ensure that they are only triggered by vehicles.

== Dispersal systems ==
There are several systems for dispersing mines to quickly cover wide areas, as opposed to a soldier laying each one individually. These system can take the form of cluster bombs or be artillery-fired. Cluster bombs contain several mines each, which could be a mixture of mine types. When the cluster bomb reaches a preset altitude, it disperses the mines over a wide area. Some anti-tank mines are designed to be fired by artillery and arm themselves once they impact the target area.

== Off-route mines ==
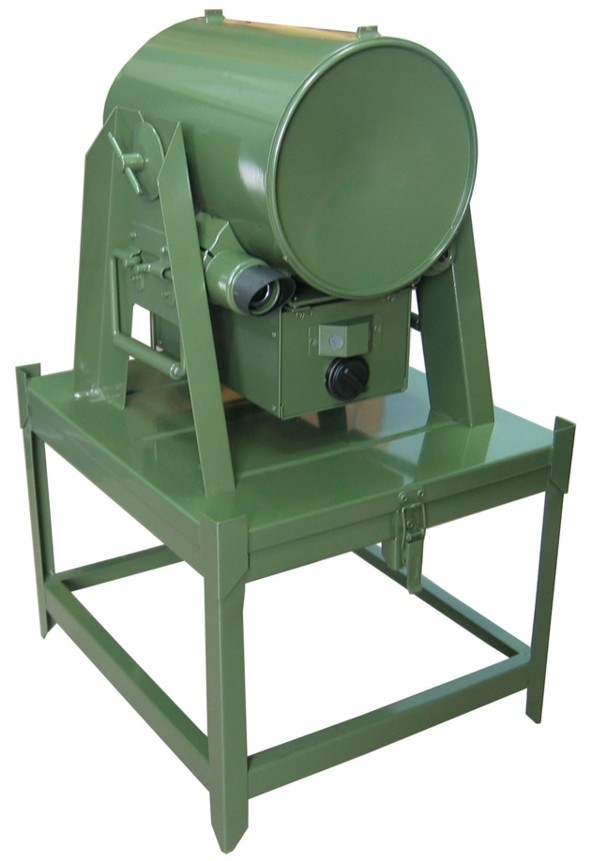
Polish MPB mine

Off-route mines are designed to be effective when detonated next to a vehicle instead of underneath. They are useful in cases where the ground or surface is not suitable for burying or concealing a mine. They normally employ a Misnay–Schardin shaped charge to fire a penetrating slug through the target armour. This self-forging projectile principle has been used for some French and Soviet off-route mines and has earned infamy as an improvised explosive device (IED) technique in Israel and especially Iraq.

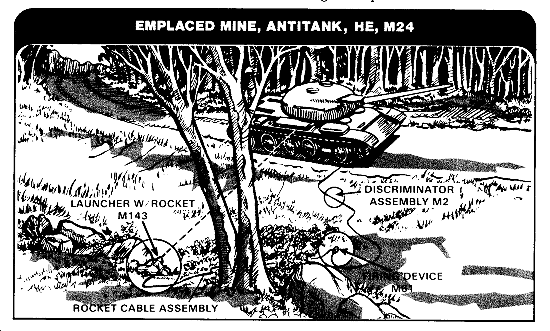
How to use an American M-24 antitank mine

Due to the critical standoff necessary for penetration and the development of standoff-neutralization technologies, shaped-charge off-route mines using the Munroe effect are more rarely encountered, though the British/French/German ARGES mine with a tandem warhead is an example of one of the more successful.

The term "off-route mine" refers to purpose-designed and manufactured anti-tank mines. Explosively formed projectiles (EFPs) are one type of IED that was used in Iraq, but most "home-made" IEDs are not employed in this manner.

== Countermeasures ==
The most effective countermeasure deployed against mine fields is mine clearing, using either explosive methods or mechanical methods. Explosive methods, such as the Giant Viper and the SADF Plofadder 160 AT, involve laying explosives across a minefield, either by propelling the charges across the field with rockets, or by dropping them from aircraft, and then detonating the explosive, clearing a path. Mechanical methods include plowing and pressure-forced detonation. In plowing, a specially designed plow attached to the front end of a heavily-armored tank is used to push aside the earth and any mines embedded in it, clearing a path as wide as the pushing tank. In pressure-forced detonation, a heavily armored tank pushes a heavy spherical or cylindrical solid roller ahead of it, causing mines to detonate.

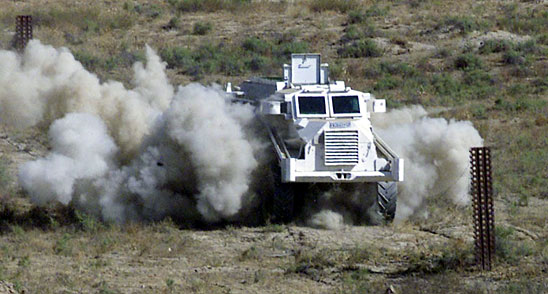
Casspir Personnel Carrier

There are also several ways of making vehicles resistant to the effects of a mine detonation to reduce the chance of crew injury. In case of a mine's blast effect, this can be done by absorbing the blast energy, deflecting it away from the vehicle hull or increasing the distance between the crew and the points where wheels touch the ground—where any detonations are likely to centre.

Another way to protect a vehicle from mines was to attach wooden planks to the sides of armored vehicles to prevent enemy soldiers from attaching magnetic mines. In the close combat on Iwo Jima, for example, some tanks were protected in this manner. A Japanese soldier running up from a concealed foxhole would not be able to stick a magnetic mine on the side of a tank encased in wood. A simple, and highly effective, technique to protect the occupants of a wheeled vehicle is to fill the tires with water. This will have the effect of absorbing and deflecting the mine's blast energy. Steel plates between the cabin and the wheels can absorb the energy, and their effectiveness is enhanced if they can be angled to deflect it away from the cabin. Increasing the distance between the wheels and passenger cabin, as is done on the South African Casspir personnel carrier, is an effective technique, although there are mobility and ease-of-driving problems with such a vehicle. A V-hull vehicle uses a wedge-shaped passenger cabin, with the thin edge of the wedge downwards, to divert blast energy away from occupants. Improvised measures such as sandbags in the vehicle floor or bulletproof vests placed on the floor may offer a small measure of protection against tiny mines.

Steel plates on the floor and sides and armoured glass protect the occupants from fragments. Mounting seats from the sides or roof of the vehicle, rather than the floor, helps protect occupants from shocks transmitted through the structure of the vehicle, and a four-point seat harness minimises the chance of injury if the vehicle is flung onto its side or its roof—a mine may throw a vehicle 5–10 m from the detonation point. Police and military can use a robot to remove mines from an area.

== Combat use ==
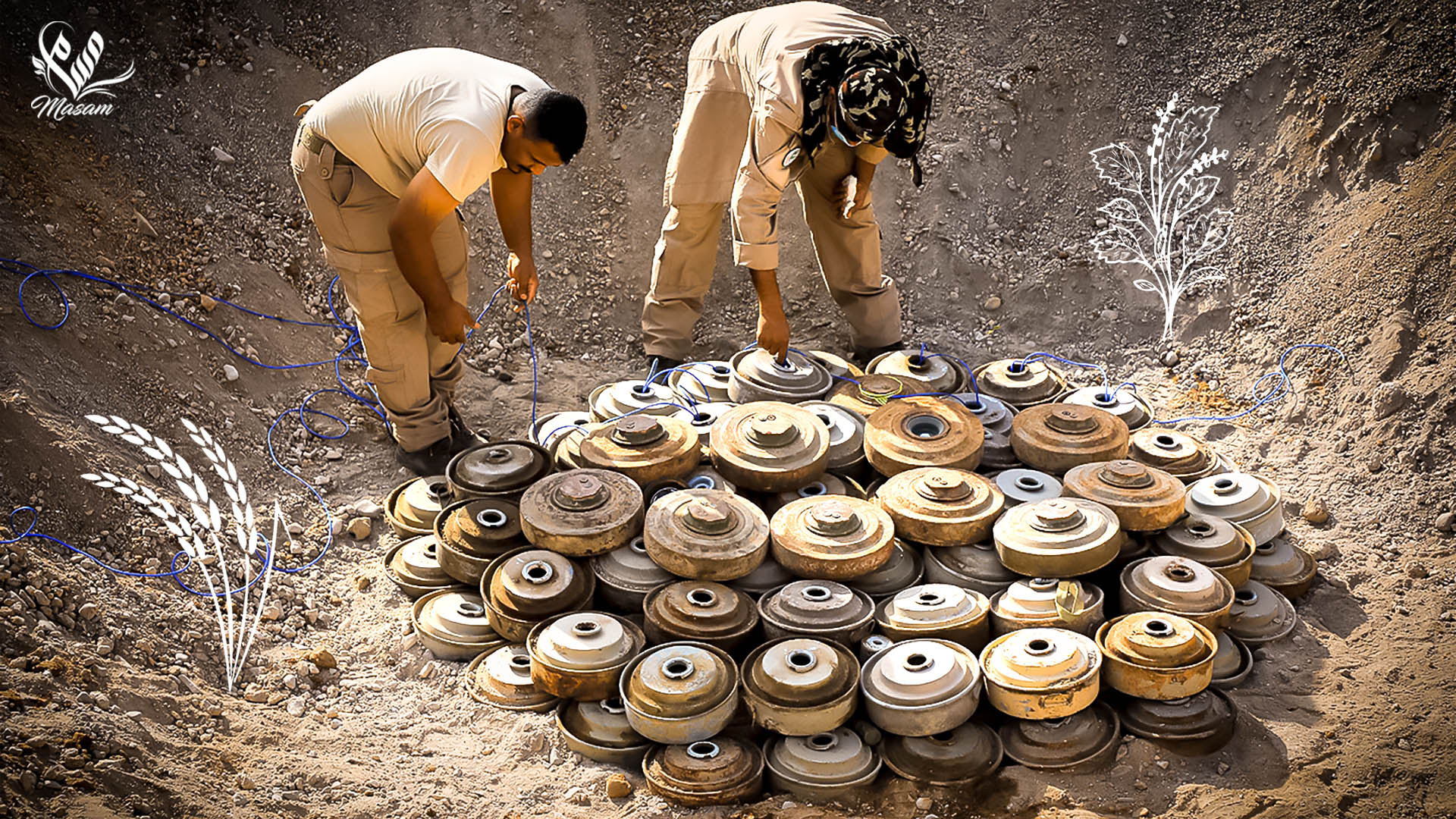
The humanitarian landmine clearance project MASAM in Yemen, 2022

Anti-tank mines have played an important role in most wars fought since they were first used.

=== Second World War ===
Anti-tank mines played a major role on the Eastern Front, where they were used in huge quantities by Soviet troops. The most common included the TM-41, TM-44, TMSB, YAM-5, and AKS. In the Battle of Kursk, combat engineers laid 503,663 AT mines, achieving a density of 1500 mines per kilometer. This was four times greater than what was seen in the Battle of Moscow.

Furthermore, mobile detachments were tasked with laying more mines directly in the path of advancing enemy tanks. A January 1943 report on Russian anti-tank tactics by the American Intelligence Bulletin attributes the following to an unnamed Soviet intelligence officer: "Each artillery battalion and, in some cases, each artillery battery, had a mobile reserve of 5 to 8 combat engineers equipped with 4 to 5 mines each. Their function was to mine unguarded tank approaches after the direction of the enemy attack had been definitely ascertained. These mines proved highly effective in stopping and even in destroying many enemy tanks."

The Wehrmacht also relied heavily on anti-tank mines to defend the Atlantic Wall, having planted six million mines of all types in Northern France alone. Mines were usually laid in staggered rows about 500 yards (460 m) deep. Along with the anti-personnel types, there were various model of Tellermines, Topfmines, and Riegel mines. On the Western front, anti-tank mines were responsible for 20–22% of Allied tank losses. Since the majority of these mines were equipped with pressure fuzes (rather than tilt-rods), tanks were more often crippled than destroyed outright.

=== Vietnam War ===
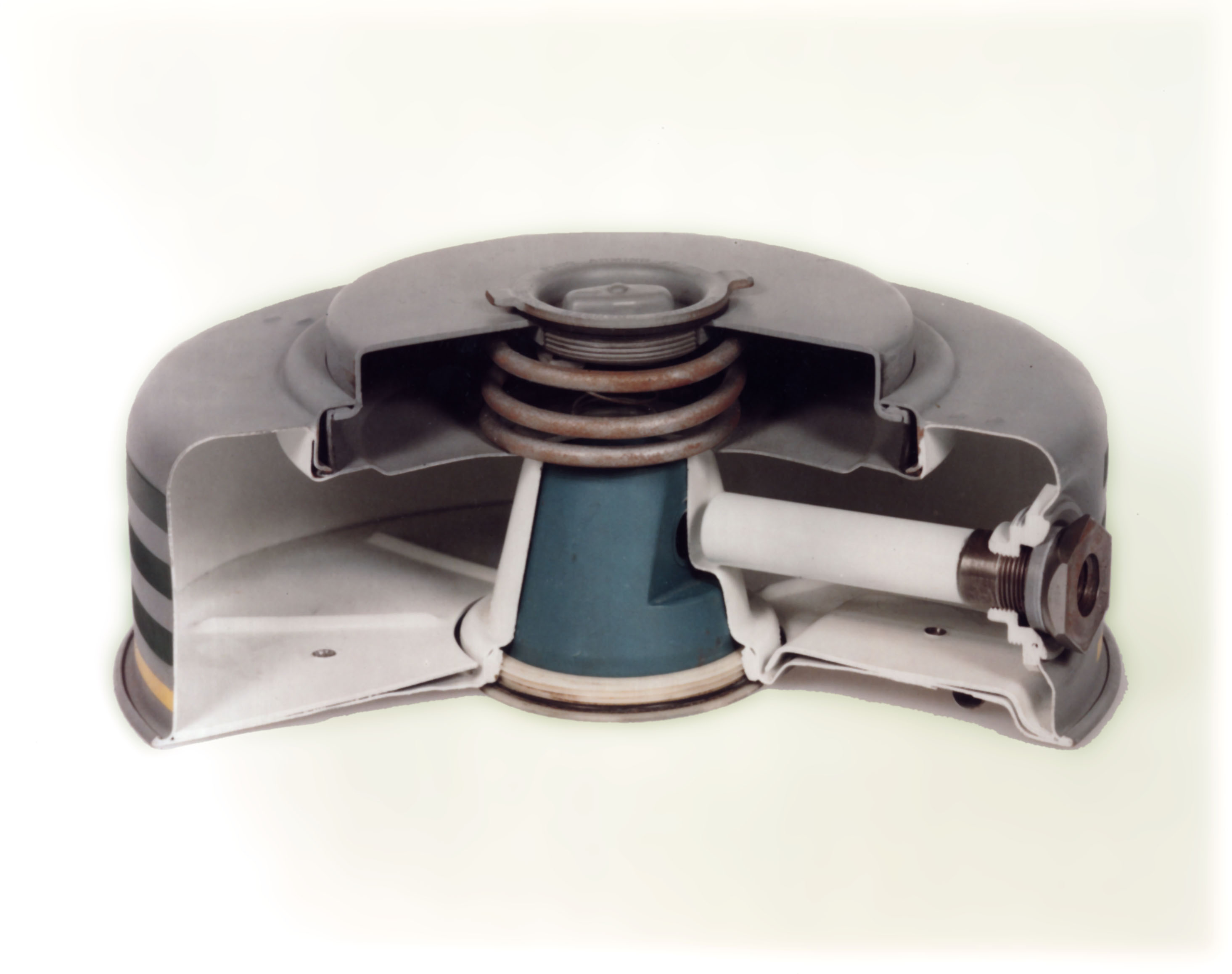
M23 and M15 landmines have broadly similar mechanisms.

During the Vietnam War, both "regular" NVA and Viet Cong forces used AT mines. These were of Soviet, Chinese, or local manufacture. Anti-tank mines were also used extensively in Cambodia and along the Thai border, planted by Pol Pot's Maoist guerrillas and the Vietnamese army, which invaded Cambodia in 1979 to topple the Khmer Rouge. Millions of these mines remain in the area, despite clearing efforts. It is estimated that they cause hundreds of deaths annually.

=== Southern Africa ===
Conflicts in southern Africa since the 1960s have often involved irregular armies or fighters engaged in guerrilla warfare, supported by the Soviet Union, United States, or South Africa. Anti-tank mines were widely used in unconventional roles and spurred the development of effective mine-resistant vehicles. As a result, both Angola and Mozambique are littered with such devices to this day (as with Cambodia).

In the Angolan Civil War and South African Border War, which covered vast sparsely populated area of southern Angola and northern Namibia, it was easy for small groups to infiltrate and mine roads, often escaping without ever being detected. The anti-tank mines were most often placed on public roads used by civilian and military vehicles and had a great psychological effect.

Mines were often laid in complex arrangements. One tactic was to lay multiple mines on top of each other to increase the blast effect. Another common tactic was to link together several mines placed within a few metres of each other, so that all would detonate when any one was triggered.

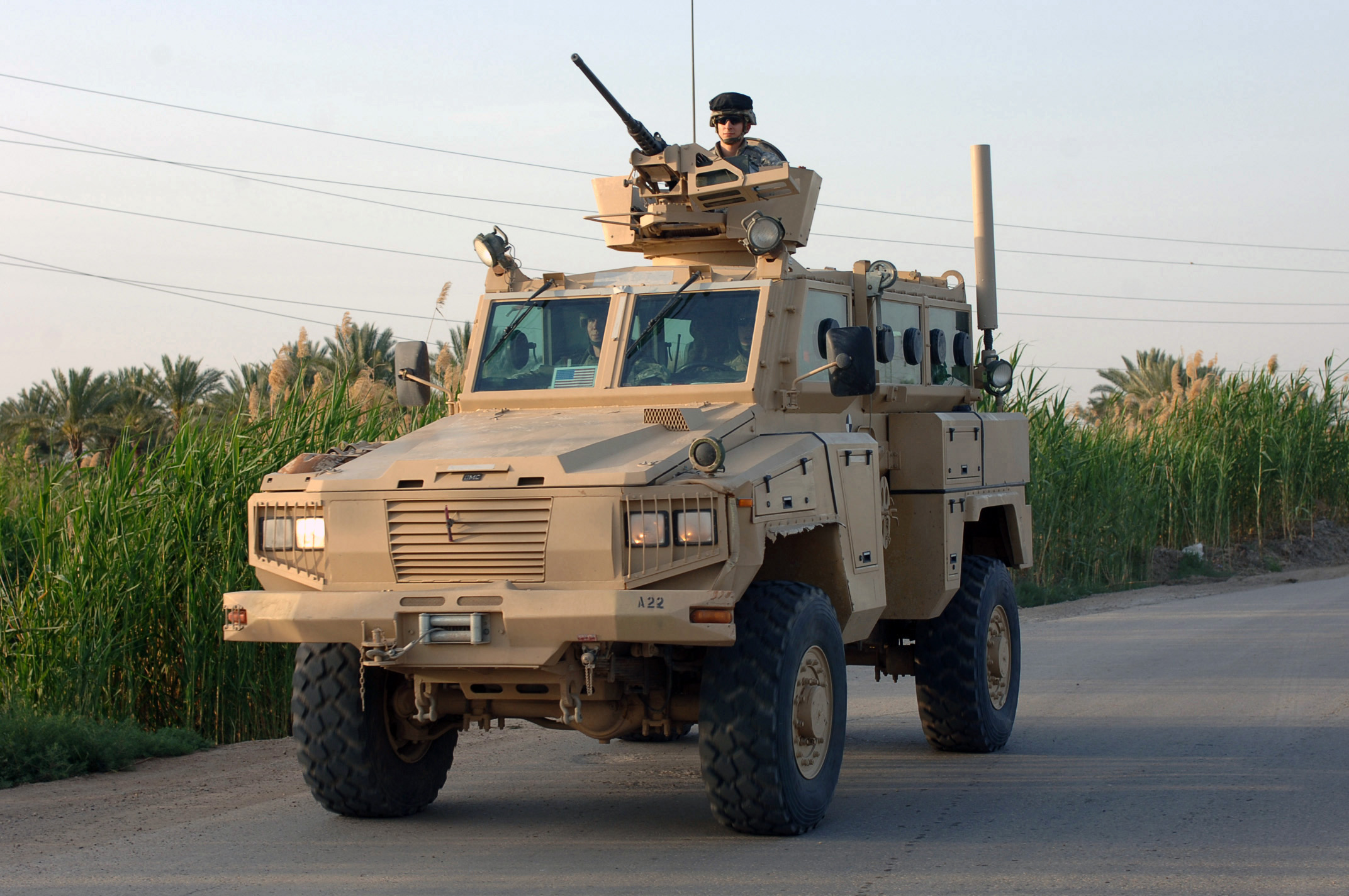
RG-31 Mine Protected Armored Personnel Carrier (MP APC) in service with the US Army in Iraq in 2006

It was because of this threat that some of the first successful mine-protected vehicles were developed by South African military and police forces. Chief amongst these were the Buffel and Casspir armoured personnel carriers and Ratel armoured fighting vehicle. They employed V-shaped hulls that deflected the blast force away from occupants. In most cases, occupants survived anti-tank mine detonations with only minor injuries. The vehicles themselves could often be repaired by replacing the wheels or some drivetrain components that were designed to be modular and replaceable for exactly this reason.

Most countries involved in Middle Eastern military missions deploy modern developments of these vehicles, such as the RG-31 (Canada, United Arab Emirates, United States) and RG-32 (Sweden).

== See also ==
- Mines Advisory Group
- Swiss Foundation for Mine Action
- List of landmines
- Blast resistant mine
- Anti-handling device

Examples of Anti-tank mines

- Type 72
- Tellermine and Topfmine – (Nazi Germany)
- TM-83 mine – (Soviet Union, Russia), an off route mine using the Misnay–Schardin effect
- ARGES mine – (United Kingdom, France, Germany)
- FFV 028 mine – (Sweden)
- ATM 2000E – (Austria)
- VS-HCT mine – (Italy)
- Hawkins grenade – (United Kingdom)

Mine dispersal systems

- GEMSS mine system – (United States)
- GATOR mine system – (United States)
- Volcano mine system – (United States)
