= Land mine =

Explosive weapon, concealed under or on the ground

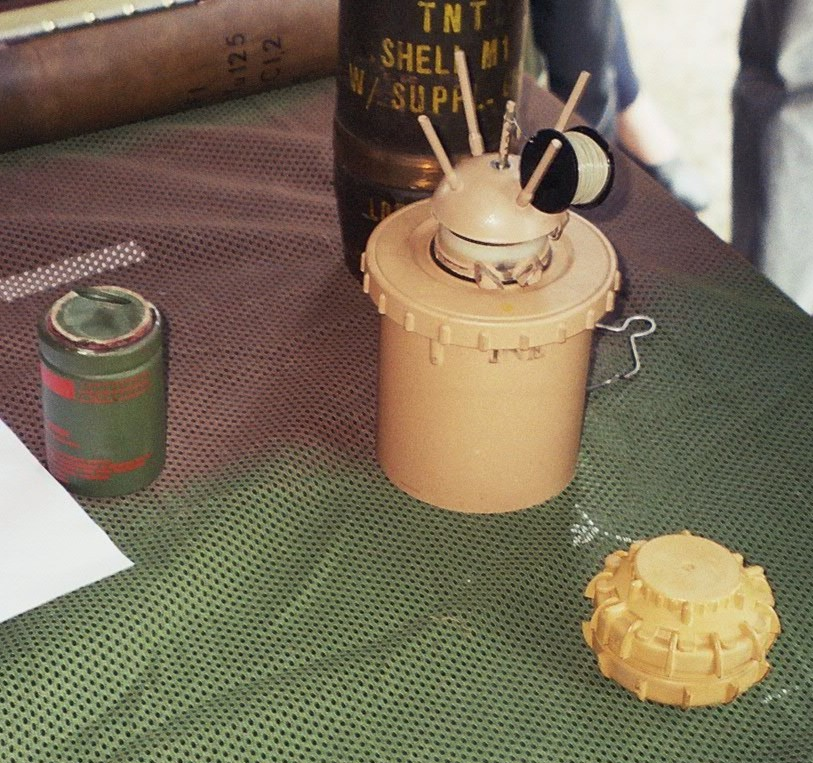
Examples of anti-personnel mines. Center: Valmara 69 (a bounding mine); right: VS-50

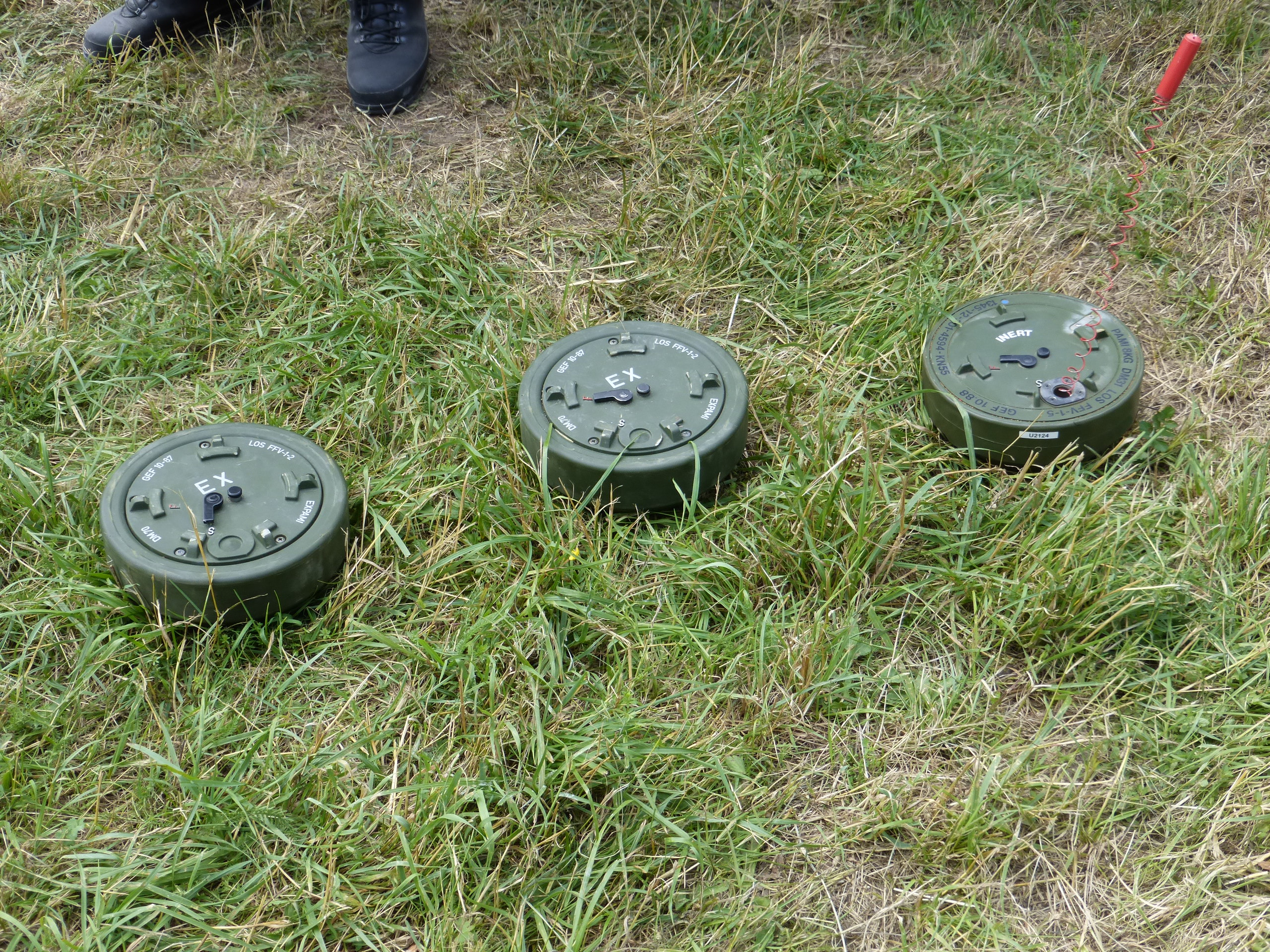
Swedish FFV 028 anti-tank-mines of the German Bundeswehr (inert versions)

A land mine, or landmine, is an explosive weapon often concealed under or camouflaged on the ground, and designed to destroy or disable enemy targets as they pass over or near it. Land mines are divided into two types: anti-tank mines, which are designed to disable tanks or other vehicles; and anti-personnel mines, designed to injure or kill people.

Land mines are typically pressure activated, exploding automatically when stepped on by a person or driven over by a vehicle, though alternative detonation mechanisms are sometimes used. A land mine may cause damage by direct blast effect, by fragments that are thrown by the blast, or by both. Land mines are typically laid throughout an area, creating a minefield which is dangerous to cross.

The use of land mines is controversial because of their indiscriminate nature and their potential to remain dangerous many years after a conflict has ended, harming civilians and the economy. With pressure from a number of campaign groups organised through the International Campaign to Ban Landmines, a global movement to prohibit their use led to the 1997 Convention on the Prohibition of the Use, Stockpiling, Production and Transfer of Anti-Personnel Mines and on their Destruction, also known as the Ottawa Treaty. To date, 164 nations have signed the treaty. However, China, Russia, and the United States are not signatories.

== Definition ==
The Anti-Personnel Mine Ban Convention (also known as the Ottawa Treaty) and the Protocol on Mines, Booby-Traps and Other Devices define a mine as a "munition designed to be placed under, on or near the ground or other surface area and to be exploded by the presence, proximity or contact of a person or vehicle". Similar in function is the booby-trap, which the protocol defines as "any device or material which is designed, constructed or adapted to kill or injure and which functions unexpectedly when a person disturbs or approaches an apparently harmless object or performs an apparently safe act". Such actions might include opening a door or picking up an object. Normally, mines are mass-produced and placed in groups, while booby traps are improvised and deployed one at a time. Booby traps can also be non-explosive devices such as punji sticks. Overlapping both categories is the improvised explosive device (IED), which is "a device placed or fabricated in an improvised manner incorporating explosive material, destructive, lethal, noxious, incendiary, pyrotechnic materials or chemicals designed to destroy, disfigure, distract or harass. They may incorporate military stores, but are normally devised from non-military components." Some meet the definition of mines or booby traps and are also referred to as "improvised", "artisanal" or "locally manufactured" mines. Other types of IED are remotely activated, so are not considered mines.

Remotely delivered mines are dropped from aircraft or carried by devices such as artillery shells or rockets. Another type of remotely delivered explosive is the cluster munition, a device that releases several submunitions ("bomblets") over a large area. The use, transfer, production, and stockpiling of cluster munitions is prohibited by the international CCM treaty. If bomblets do not explode, they are referred to as unexploded ordnance (UXO), along with unexploded artillery shells and other explosive devices that were not manually placed (that is, mines and booby traps are not UXOs). Explosive remnants of war (ERW) include UXOs and abandoned explosive ordnance (AXO), devices that were never used and were left behind after a conflict.

== History ==
The history of land mines can be divided into three main phases: In the ancient world, buried spikes provided many of the same functions as modern mines. Mines using gunpowder as the explosive were used from the Ming dynasty to the American Civil War. Subsequently, high explosives were developed for use in land mines.

=== Before explosives ===
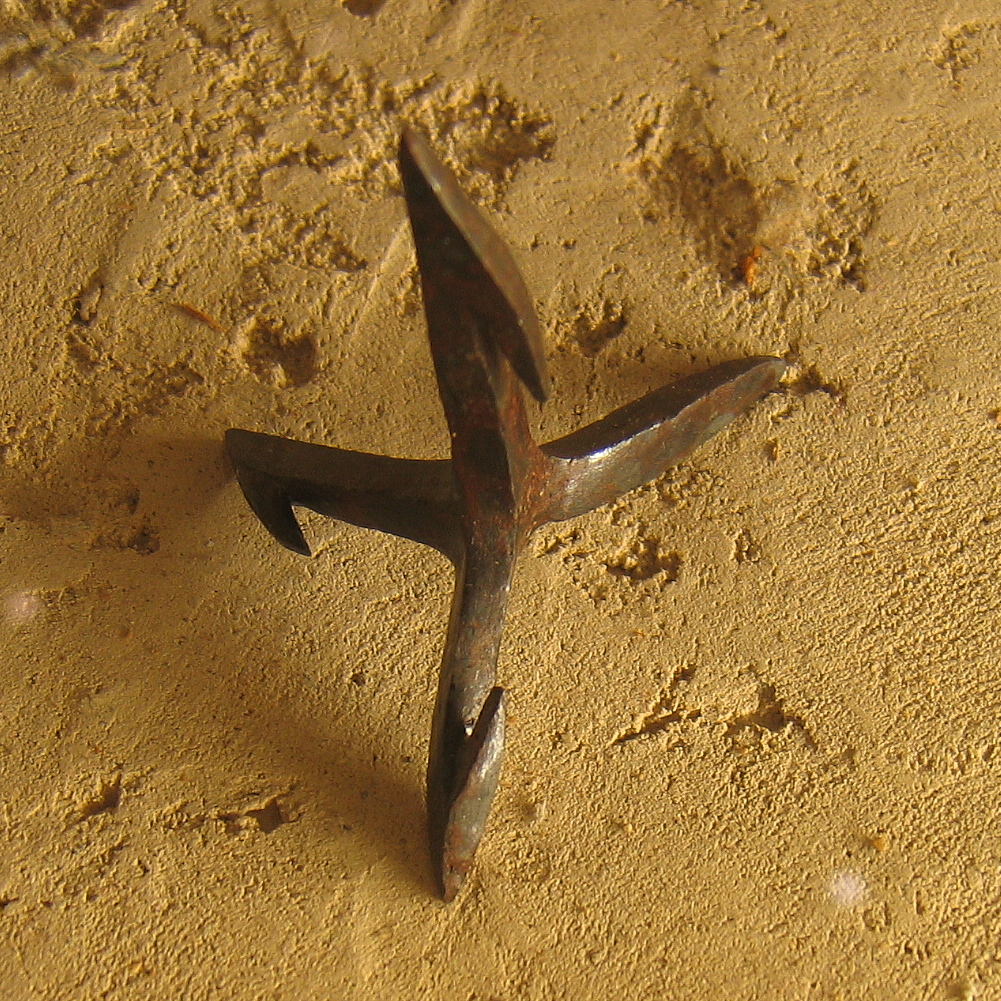
Roman caltrop

Some fortifications in the Roman Empire were surrounded by a series of hazards buried in the ground. These included goads, 30-centimetre-long (1 ft) pieces of wood with iron hooks on their ends; lilia (lilies, so named after their appearance), which were pits in which sharpened logs were arranged in a five-point pattern; and abatis, fallen trees with sharpened branches facing outwards. As with modern land mines, they were "victim-operated", often concealed, and complicated attempts by the enemy to remove the obstacles by making them vulnerable to projectiles such as spears. A notable use of these defenses was by Julius Caesar in the Battle of Alesia. His forces were besieging Vercingetorix, the leader of the Gauls, but Vercingetorix managed to send for reinforcements. To maintain the siege and defend against the reinforcements, Caesar formed a line of fortifications on both sides, and they played an important role in his victory. Lilies were also used by Scots against the English at the Battle of Bannockburn in 1314, and by Germans at the Battle of Passchendaele in the First World War.

A more easily deployed defense used by the Romans was the caltrop, a weapon 12 to 15 cm (5 to 6 in) across with four sharp spikes that are oriented so that when it is thrown on the ground, one spike always points up. As with modern antipersonnel mines, caltrops are designed to disable soldiers rather than kill them; they are also more effective in stopping mounted forces, who lack the advantage of being able to carefully scrutinize each step they take (though forcing foot-mounted forces to take the time to do so has benefits in and of itself). They were used by the Jin dynasty in China at the Battle of Zhongdu to slow down the advance of Genghis Khan's army; Joan of Arc was wounded by one in the Siege of Orléans; in Japan they are known as tetsu-bishi and were used by ninjas from the fourteenth century onward. Caltrops are still strung together and used as roadblocks in some modern conflicts.

=== Gunpowder ===
==== East Asia ====
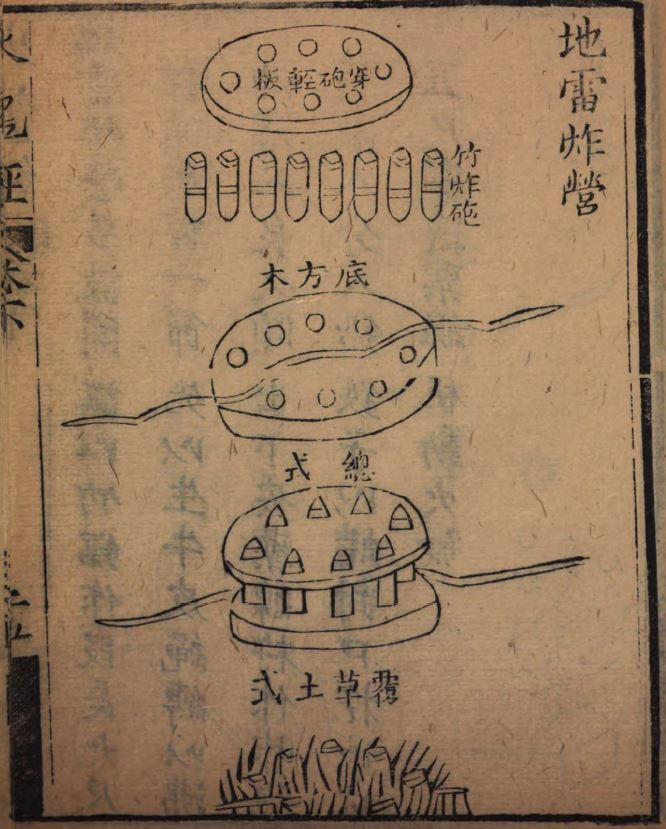
Chinese illustration of a land mine with eight explosive charges, from the Huolongjing, 14th century

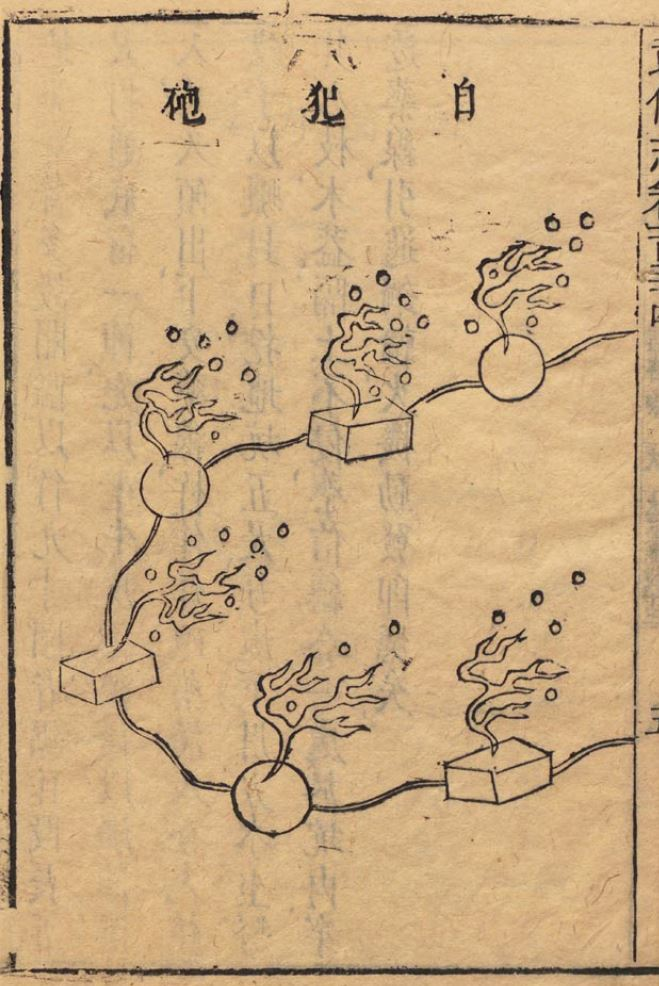
A "self-tripped trespass land mine" from the Wubei Zhi, 1621

Gunpowder, an explosive mixture of sulfur, charcoal and potassium nitrate was invented in China by the 10th century and was used in warfare soon after. An "enormous bomb", credited to Lou Qianxia, was used in 1277 by the Chinese at the Battle of Zhongdu.

A 14th-century Ming dynasty Chinese military treatise, the Huolongjing (Fire Dragon Manual), describes hollow cast iron cannonball shells filled with gunpowder. The wad of the mine was made of hard wood, carrying three different fuses in case of defective connection to the touch hole. These fuses were long and lit by hand, so they required carefully timed calculations of enemy movements.

The Huolongjing also describes land mines that were set off by enemy movement. A 3-metre (9 ft) length of bamboo was waterproofed by wrapping it in cowhide and covering it with oil. It was filled with compressed gunpowder and lead or iron pellets, sealed with wax and concealed in a trench. The triggering mechanism was not fully described until the early 17th century. When the enemy stepped onto hidden boards, they dislodged a pin, causing a weight to fall. A cord attached to the weight was wrapped around a drum attached to two steel wheels; when the weight fell, the wheels struck sparks against flint, igniting a set of fuses leading to multiple mines. A similar mechanism was used in the first wheellock musket in Europe as sketched by Leonardo da Vinci around 1500 AD.

Another victim-operated device was the "underground sky-soaring thunder", which lured bounty hunters with halberds, pikes, and lances planted in the ground. If they pulled on one of these weapons, the butt end disturbed a bowl underneath and a slow-burning incandescent material in the bowl ignited the fuses. (Note: According to the Wubei Huolongjing (17th century), the material could burn continuously for 20 to 30 days without going out. Its formula included 1 lb (0.45 kg) of white sandal wood powder, 3 oz (85 g) of iron rust (ferric oxide), 5 oz (140 g) of "white" charcoal powder (from quicklime), 2 oz (57 g) of willow charcoal powder, 6 oz (170 g) of dried, ground, and powdered red dates, and 3 oz (85 g) of bran.)

==== Western world ====
At Augsburg in 1573, three centuries after the Chinese invented the first pressure-operated mine, a German military engineer by the name of Samuel Zimmermann invented the Fladdermine (flying mine). It consisted of around a kilogram (a few pounds) of black powder buried near the surface and was activated by stepping on it or tripping a wire that made a flintlock fire. Such mines were deployed on the slope in front of a fort. They were used during the Franco-Prussian War, but were probably not very effective because a flintlock does not work for long when left untended.

The fougasse, was a precursor of modern fragmentation mines and the claymore mine. It consisted of a cone-shape hole with gunpowder at the bottom, covered either by rocks and scrap iron (stone fougasse) or mortar shells, similar to large black powder hand grenades (shell fougasse). It was triggered by a flintlock connected to a tripwire on the surface. It could sometimes cause heavy casualties but required high maintenance due to the susceptibility of black powder to dampness. Consequently, it was mainly employed in the defenses of major fortifications, in which role it used in several European wars of the eighteenth century and the American Revolution.

Early land mines suffered from unreliable fuses which were vulnerable to damp. This changed with the invention of the safety fuse. Later, command initiation, the ability to detonate a charge immediately instead of waiting several minutes for a fuse to burn, became possible after electricity was developed. An electric current sent down a wire could ignite the charge with a spark. The Russians claim first use of this technology in the Russo-Turkish War of 1828–1829, and with it the fougasse remained useful until it was superseded by the Claymore mine in the 1960s.

Victim-activated mines were also unreliable because they relied on a flintlock to ignite the explosive. The percussion cap, developed in the early 19th century, made them much more reliable, and pressure-operated mines were deployed on land and sea in the Crimean War (1853–1856).

During the American Civil War, the Confederate brigadier general Gabriel J. Rains deployed thousands of "torpedoes" consisting of artillery shells with pressure caps, beginning with the Battle of Yorktown in 1862. As a captain, Rains had earlier employed explosive booby traps during the Seminole Wars in Florida in 1840. Over the course of the war, mines only caused a few hundred casualties, but they had a large effect on morale and slowed down the advance of Union troops. Many on both sides considered the use of mines barbaric, and in response, generals in the Union Army forced Confederate prisoners to remove the mines.

=== High explosives ===
Starting in the 19th century, more powerful explosives than gunpowder were developed, often for non-military reasons such as blasting train tunnels in the Alps and Rockies. Guncotton, up to four times more powerful than gunpowder, was invented by Christian Schonbein in 1846. It was dangerous to make until Frederick Augustus Abel developed a safe method in 1865. From the 1870s to the First World War, it was the standard explosive used by the British military.

In 1847, Ascanio Sobrero invented nitroglycerine to treat angina pectoris and it turned out to be a much more powerful explosive than guncotton. It was very dangerous to use until Alfred Nobel formulated a solid mixture he called dynamite and paired it with a safe detonator he developed. Even then, dynamite needed to be stored carefully or it could form crystals that detonated easily. Thus, the military still preferred guncotton.

In 1863, the German chemical industry developed trinitrotoluene (TNT). This had the advantage that it was difficult to detonate, so it could withstand the shock of firing by artillery pieces. It was also advantageous for land mines for several reasons: it was not detonated by the shock of shells landing nearby; it was lightweight, unaffected by damp, and stable under a wide range of conditions; it could be melted to fill a container of any shape, and it was cheap to make. Thus, it became the standard explosive in mines after the First World War.

==== Between the American Civil War and the First World War ====
The British used mines in the Siege of Khartoum. A Sudanese Mahdist force much larger than British strength was held off for ten months, but the town was ultimately taken and the British massacred. In the Boer War (1899–1903), they succeeded in holding Mafeking against Boer forces with the help of a mixture of real and fake minefields; and they laid mines alongside railroad tracks to discourage sabotage.

In the Russo-Japanese War of 1904–1905, both sides used land and sea mines, although the effect on land mainly affected morale. The naval mines were far more effective, destroying several battleships.

==== First World War ====
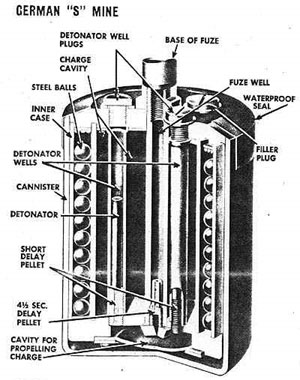
Cutaway diagram of the S-mine

One sign of the increasing power of explosives used in land mines was that, by the First World War, they burst into about 1,000 high-velocity fragments; in the Franco-Prussian War (1870), it had only been 20 to 30 fragments. Nevertheless, anti-personnel mines were not a big factor in the war because machine guns, barbed wire and rapid-fire artillery were far more effective defenses. An exception was in Africa (now Tanzania and Namibia) where the warfare was much more mobile.

Towards the end of the war, the British started to use tanks to break through trench defenses. The Germans responded with anti-tank guns and mines. Improvised mines gave way to mass-produced mines consisting of wooden boxes filled with guncotton, and minefields were standardized to stop masses of tanks from advancing.

German and ANZAC troops are recorded as having booby trapped their positions with improvised anti-personnel mines (improvised explosive devices) as they retreated. Accounts mention bodies being rigged with explosives for advancing forces to encounter. German troops are also recorded having used makeshift detonation mechanisms, such as clocks and tripwires connected to lighters, for anti-personnel mines.

==== Interwar period ====
Between world wars, the future Allies did little work on land mines, but the Germans developed a series of anti-tank mines, the Tellermines (plate mines). They also developed the Schrapnell mine (also known as the S-mine), the first bounding mine. When triggered, this jumped up to about waist height and exploded, sending thousands of steel balls in all directions. Triggered by pressure, trip wires or electronics, it could harm soldiers within an area of about 260 square metres (2,800 ft^{2}).

Use of land mines during the Irish Civil war were recorded in various non-standard roles, including a summary execution of captured anti-treaty fighters, and potentially in the destruction of the public records office, although debated.

==== Second World War ====
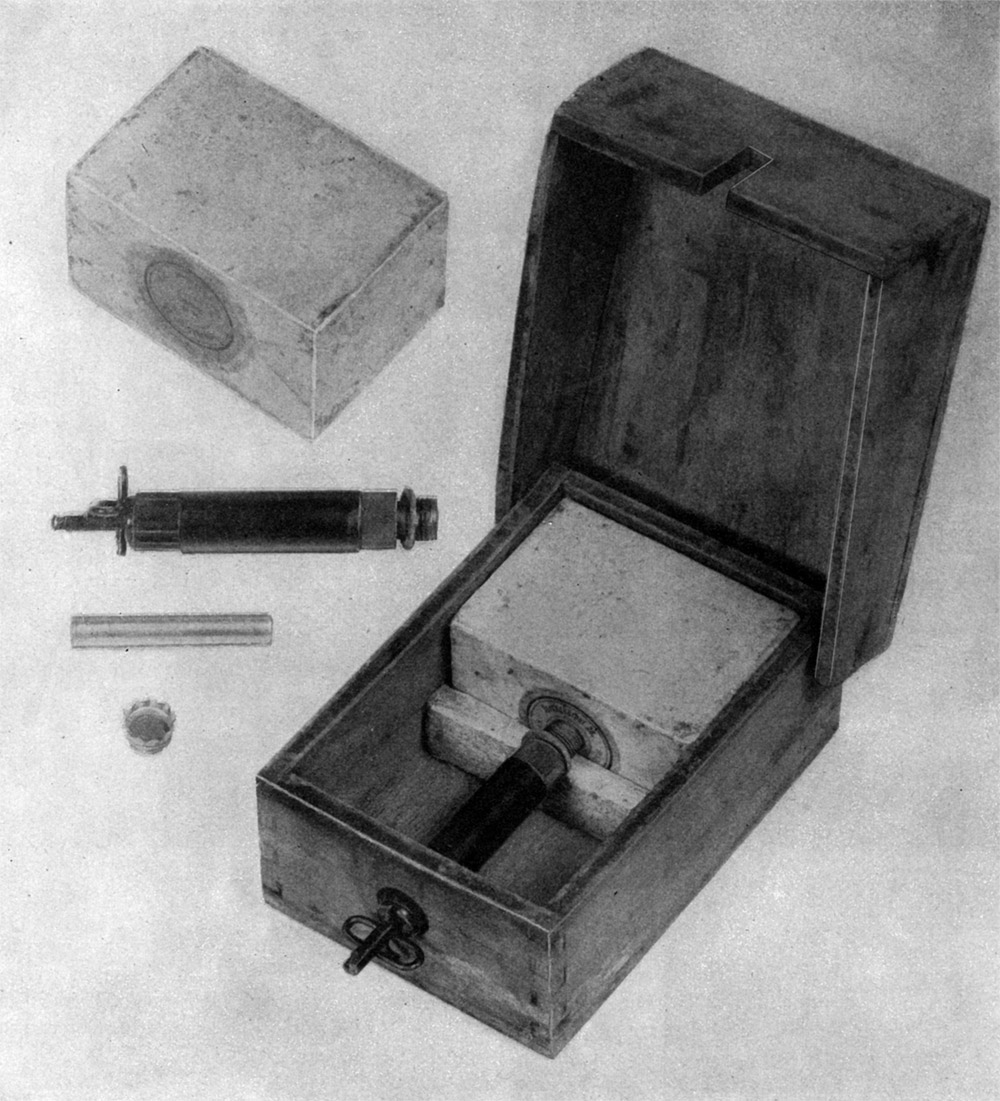
The Schü-mine 42, the most common mine used in the Second World War

Tens of millions of mines were laid in the Second World War, particularly in the deserts of North Africa and the steppes of Eastern Europe, where the open ground favored tanks. However, the first country to use them was Finland. They were defending against a much larger Soviet force with over 6,000 tanks, twenty times the number the Finns had; but they had terrain that was broken up by lakes and forests, so tank movement was restricted to roads and tracks. Their defensive line, the Mannerheim Line, integrated these natural defenses with mines, including simple fragmentation mines mounted on stakes.

While the Germans were advancing rapidly using blitzkrieg tactics, they did not make much use of mines. After 1942, however, they were on the defensive and became the most inventive and systematic users of mines. Their production shot up and they began inventing new types of mines as the Allies found ways to counter the existing ones. To make it more difficult to remove antitank mines, they surrounded them with S-mines and added anti-handling devices that would explode when soldiers tried to lift them. They also took a formal approach to laying mines and they kept detailed records of the locations of mines.

In the Second Battle of El Alamein in 1942, the Germans prepared for an Allied attack by laying about half a million mines in two fields running across the entire battlefield and five miles (8 km) deep. Nicknamed the "Devil's gardens", they were covered by 88 mm anti-tank guns and small-arms fire. The Allies prevailed, but at the cost of over half their tanks; 20 percent of the losses were caused by mines.

The Soviets learned the value of mines from their war with Finland, and when Germany invaded they made heavy use of them, manufacturing over 67 million. At the Battle of Kursk, which put an end to the German advance, they laid over a million mines in eight belts with an overall depth of 35 kilometres (22 mi).

Mines forced tanks to slow down and wait for soldiers to go ahead and remove the mines. The main method of breaching minefields involved prodding the dirt with a bayonet or stick at an angle of 30 degrees to avoid pressuring the top of the mine. Since all mines at the beginning of the war had metal casings, metal detectors could be used to speed up the locating of mines. A Polish officer, Józef Kosacki, developed a portable mine detector known as the Polish mine detector. To counter the detector, Germans developed mines with wooden casings, the Schü-mine 42 (anti-personnel) and Holzmine 42 (anti-tank). Effective, cheap and easy to make, the Schü-mine became the most common mine in the war. Mine casings were also made of glass, concrete and clay. The Russians developed a mine with a pressed-cardboard casing, the PMK40, and the Italians made an anti-tank mine out of bakelite. In 1944, the Germans created the Topfmine, an entirely non-metallic mine. They ensured that they could detect their own mines by covering them with radioactive sand; the Allies did not find this out until after the war.

Several mechanical methods for clearing mines were tried. Heavy rollers were attached to tanks or cargo trucks, but they did not last long and their weight made the tanks considerably slower. Tanks and bulldozers pushed ploughs that pushed aside any mines to a depth of 30 cm (12 in). The Bangalore torpedo, a long thin tube filled with explosives, was invented in 1912 and used to clear barbed wire; larger versions such as the Snake and the Conger were developed for clearing mines, but were not very effective. One of the best options was the flail, which had weights attached by chains to rotating drums. The first version, the Scorpion, was attached to the Matilda tank and used in the Second Battle of El Alamein. The Crab, attached to the Sherman tank, was faster, at 2 kilometres per hour (1.2 mph); it was used during D-Day and the aftermath.

==== Cold War ====
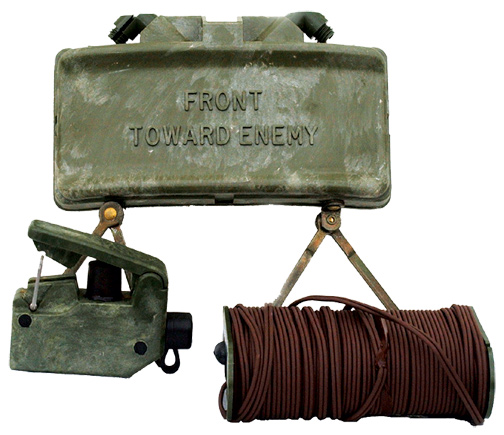
Claymore mine with firing device and electric blasting cap assembly

During the Cold War, the members of NATO were concerned about massive armored attacks by the Soviet Union. They planned for a minefield stretching across the entire West German border, and developed new types of mines. The British designed an anti-tank mine, the Mark 7, to defeat rollers by detonating the second time it was pressed. It also had a 0.7-second delay so the tank would be directly over the mine. They also developed the first scatterable mine, the No. 7 Dingbat. The Americans used the M6 anti-tank mine and tripwire-operated bounding anti-personnel mines such as the M2 and M16.

In the Korean War, land mine use was dictated by the steep terrain, narrow valleys, forest cover and lack of developed roads. This made tanks less effective and more easily stopped by mines. However, mines laid near roads were often easy to spot. In response to this problem, the US developed the M24, a mine that was placed off to the side of the road. When triggered by a tripwire, it fired a rocket. However, the mine was not available until after the war.

The Chinese had success with massed infantry attacks. The extensive forest cover limited the range of machine guns, but anti-personnel mines were effective. However, mines were poorly recorded and marked, often becoming as much a hazard to allies as enemies. Tripwire-operated mines were not defended by pressure mines; the Chinese were often able to disable them and reuse them against UN forces.

Looking for more destructive mines, the Americans developed the Claymore, a directional fragmentation mine that hurls steel balls in a 60-degree arc at a speed of 1,200 m/s (3,900 ft/s). They also developed a pressure-operated mine, the M14 "toe-popper". These, too, were ready too late for the Korean War.

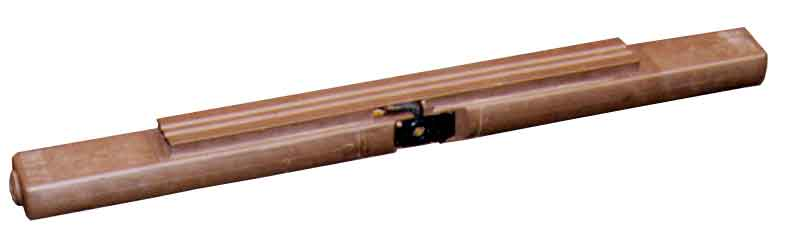
An L9 Bar Mine

In 1948, the British developed the No. 6 anti-personnel mine, a minimum-metal mine with a narrow diameter, making it difficult to detect with metal detectors or prodding. Its three-pronged pressure piece inspired the nickname "carrot mine". However, it was unreliable in wet conditions. In the 1960s the Canadians developed a similar, but more reliable mine, the C3A1 "Elsie" and the British army adopted it. The British also developed the L9 bar mine, a wide anti-tank mine with a rectangular shape, which covered more area, allowing a minefield to be laid four times as fast as previous mines. They also upgraded the Dingbat to the Ranger, a plastic mine that was fired from a truck-mounted discharger that could fire 72 mines at a time.

In the 1950s, the US Operation Doan Brook studied the feasibility of delivering mines by air. This led to three types of air-delivered mine. Wide Area Anti-Personnel Mines (WAAPMs) were small steel spheres that discharged tripwires when they hit the ground; each dispenser held 540 mines. The BLU-43 Dragontooth was small and had a flattened "W" shape to slow its descent, while the gravel mine was larger. Both were packed by the thousand into bombs. All three were designed to inactivate after a period of time, but any that failed to activate presented a safety challenge. Over 37 million gravel mines were produced between 1967 and 1968, and when they were dropped in places like Vietnam their locations were unmarked and unrecorded. A similar problem was presented by unexploded cluster munitions.

The next generation of scatterable mines arose in response to the increasing mobility of war. The Germans developed the Skorpion system, which scattered AT2 mines from a tracked vehicle. The Italians developed a helicopter delivery system that could rapidly switch between SB-33 anti-personnel mines and SB-81 anti-tank mines. The US developed a range of systems called the Family of Scatterable Mines (FASCAM) that could deliver mines by fast jet, artillery, helicopter and ground launcher.

==== Middle Eastern conflicts ====
The Iraq-Iran War, the Gulf War, and the Islamic State have all contributed to land mine saturation in Iraq from the 1980s through 2020. In 2019, Iraq was the most saturated country in the world with land mines. Countries that provided land mines during the Iran-Iraq War included Belgium, Canada, Chile, China, Egypt, France, Italy, Romania, Singapore, the former Soviet Union and the US, and were concentrated in the Kurdish areas in the northern area of Iraq. During the Gulf War, the US deployed 117,634 mines, with 27,967 being anti-personnel mines and 89,667 being anti-vehicle mines. The US did not use land mines during the Iraq War.

Landmines and other unexploded battlefield ordnance contaminate at least 724 million square metres (280 mi^{2}) of land in Afghanistan. Only two of Afghanistan's twenty-nine provinces are believed to be free of landmines. The most heavily mined provinces are Herat and Kandahar. Since 1989, nearly 44,000 Afghan civilians have been recorded to have been killed or injured by landmines and explosive remnants of war (ERW) averaging to around 110 people per month. Improvised mines and ERW from armed clashes caused nearly 99 percent of the casualties recorded in 2021.

==== Invasion of Ukraine ====
During the 2022 Russian Invasion of Ukraine, both Russian and Ukrainian forces have used land mines. Ukrainian officials claim Russian forces planted thousands of land mines or other explosive devices during their withdrawal from Ukrainian cities, including in civilian areas. Russian forces have also used remotely delivered anti-personnel mines such as the POM-3.

=== Chemical and nuclear ===
In the First World War, the Germans developed a device, nicknamed the "Yperite Mine" by the British, that they left behind in abandoned trenches and bunkers. It was detonated by a delayed charge, spreading mustard gas ("Yperite"). In the Second World War they developed a modern chemical mine, the Sprüh-Büchse 37 (Bounding Gas Mine 37), but never used it. The United States developed the M1 chemical mine, which used mustard gas, in 1939; and the M23 chemical mine, which used the VX nerve agent, in 1960. The Soviets developed the KhF, a "bounding chemical mine". The French had chemical mines and the Iraqis were believed to have them before the invasion of Kuwait. In 1997, the Chemical Weapons Convention came into force, prohibiting the use of chemical weapons and mandating their destruction. By July 2023 all declared stockpiles of chemical weapons were destroyed.

For a few decades during the Cold War, the US developed atomic demolition munitions, often referred to as nuclear land mines. These were portable nuclear bombs that could be placed by hand, and could be detonated remotely or with a timer. Some of these were deployed in Europe. Governments in West Germany, Turkey and Greece wanted to have nuclear minefields as a defense against attack from the Warsaw Pact. However, such weapons were politically and tactically infeasible, and by 1989 the last of these munitions was retired. The British also had a project, codenamed Blue Peacock, to develop nuclear mines to be buried in Germany; the project was cancelled in 1958.

== Characteristics and function ==
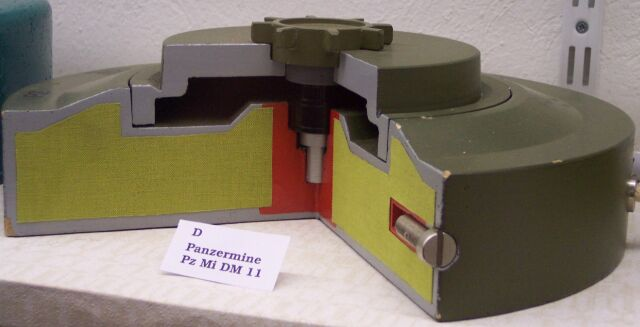
Section of an anti-tank mine. Note the yellow main charge wrapped around a red booster charge, and the secondary fuze well on the side of the mine designed for an anti-handling device.

Diagram of components

A conventional land mine consists of a casing that is mostly filled with the main charge. It has a firing mechanism such as a pressure plate; this triggers a detonator or igniter, which in turn sets off a booster charge. There may be additional firing mechanisms in anti-handling devices.

=== Firing mechanisms and initiating actions ===
A land mine can be triggered by a number of things including pressure, movement, sound, magnetism and vibration. Anti-personnel mines commonly use the pressure of a person's foot as a trigger, but tripwires are also frequently employed. Because modern anti-vehicle mines usually employ magnetic triggers, they can detonate even if the victim's tires or tracks do not directly impact it. Advanced mines are able to sense the difference between friendly and enemy types of vehicles by way of a built-in signature catalog (an identification friend or foe system). This theoretically enables friendly forces to use the mined area while denying the enemy access.

Many mines combine the main trigger with a touch or tilt trigger to prevent enemy engineers from defusing the mine. Land mine designs tend to use as little metal as possible to make searching with a metal detector more difficult; land mines made mostly of plastic have the added advantage of being very inexpensive.

Some types of modern mines are designed to self-destruct, or chemically render themselves inert after a period of weeks or months to reduce the likelihood of civilian casualties at the conflict's end. These self-destruct mechanisms are not absolutely reliable, and most land mines laid historically are not equipped in this manner. There is a common myth that mines will become inert and harmless after a few years in the ground, but in fact they can remain dangerous for many decades.

There is a common misconception that a landmine is armed by stepping on it and only triggered by stepping off. In all cases the initial pressure trigger detonates the mine, since mines are designed to kill or maim the victims rather than having them standing still until the mine can be disarmed. This misperception originated with the fictional portrayal of mines, often in movies in which the disarming of a mine is a source of narrative tension.

=== Anti-handling devices ===
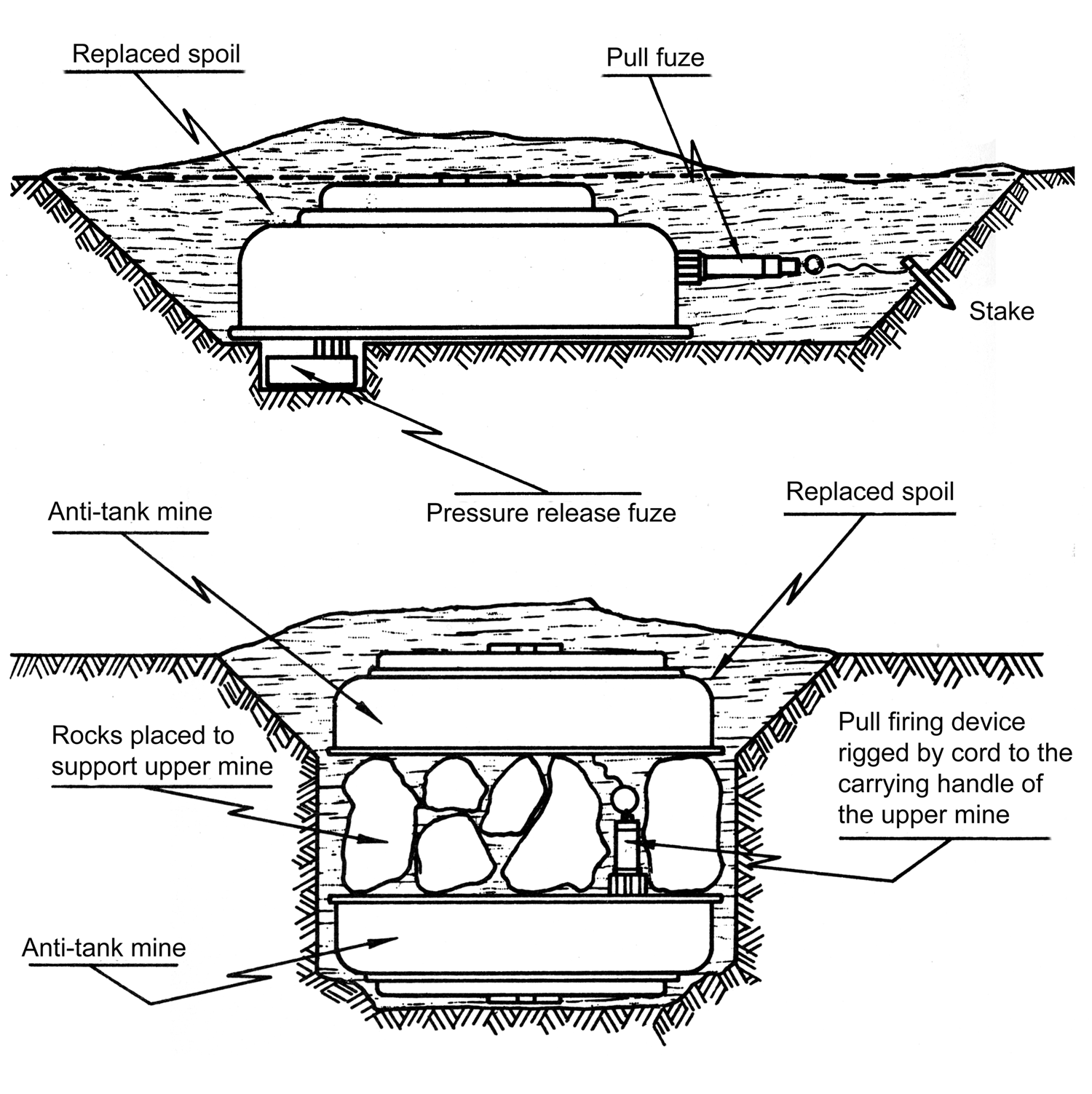
Examples of anti-handling devices

Anti-handling devices detonate the mine if someone attempts to lift, shift or disarm it. The intention is to hinder deminers by discouraging any attempts to clear minefields. There is a degree of overlap between the function of a boobytrap and an anti-handling device insofar as some mines have optional fuze pockets into which standard pull or pressure-release boobytrap firing devices can be screwed. Alternatively, some mines may mimic a standard design, but actually be specifically intended to kill deminers, such as the MC-3 and PMN-3 variants of the PMN mine. Anti-handling devices can be found on both anti-personnel mines and anti-tank mines, either as an integral part of their design or as improvised add-ons. For this reason, the standard render safe procedure for mines is often to destroy them on site without attempting to lift them.

=== Smart mines ===
"Smart mines" use a number of advanced technologies developed in the late 20th and early 21st century. Most commonly, this includes mechanisms to deactivate or self-destruct the mine after a preset period of time. This is intended to reduce civilian casualties and simplify demining.

Other innovations include "self-healing" minefields, which detect gaps in the field and can direct the mines to rearrange their positions, eliminating the gaps.

== Anti-tank mines ==
Anti-tank mines were created in response to the invention of the tank in the First World War. Though improvised at first, purpose-built designs were soon developed. Set off when a tank passes, they attack the tank at one of its weaker areas – the tracks. They are designed to immobilize or destroy vehicles and their occupants. In US military terminology destroying the vehicles is referred to as a catastrophic kill while only disabling its movement is referred to as a mobility kill.

Anti-tank mines are typically larger than anti-personnel mines and require more pressure to detonate. The high trigger pressure, normally requiring 100 kilograms (220 lb) prevents them from being set off by infantry or smaller vehicles of lesser importance. More modern anti-tank mines use shaped charges to focus and increase the armor penetration of the explosives.

== Anti-personnel mines ==
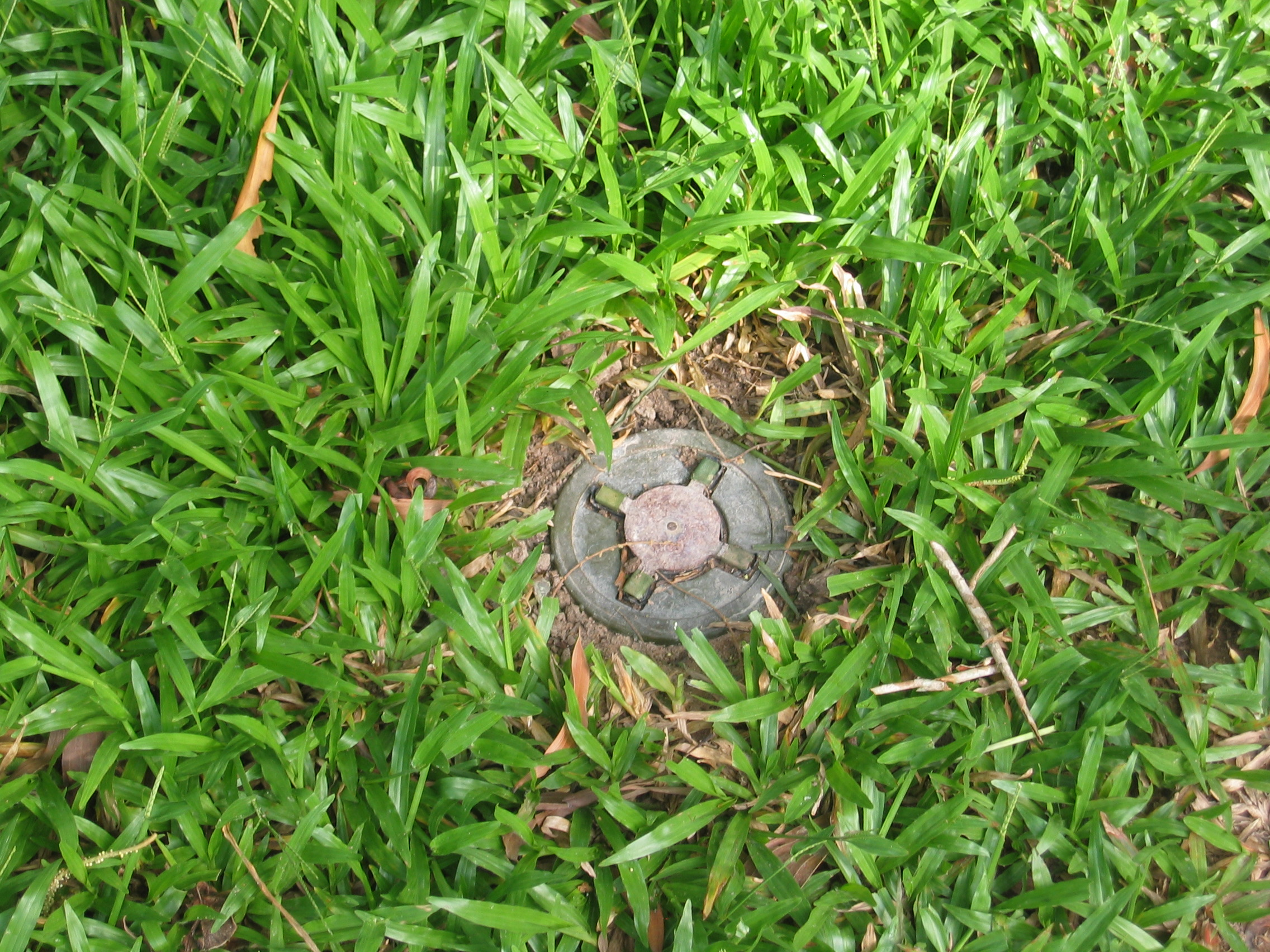
Anti-personnel mine in Cambodia

Anti-personnel mines are designed primarily to kill or injure people, as opposed to vehicles. They are often designed to injure rather than kill to increase the logistical support (evacuation, medical) burden on the opposing force. Some types of anti-personnel mines can also damage the tracks or wheels of armored vehicles.

In the asymmetric warfare conflicts and civil wars of the 21st century, improvised explosives, known as IEDs, have partially supplanted conventional land mines as the source of injury to dismounted (pedestrian) soldiers and civilians. IEDs are used mainly by insurgents and terrorists against regular armed forces and civilians. The injuries from the anti-personnel IED were recently reported in BMJ Open to be far worse than with landmines resulting in multiple limb amputations and lower body mutilation.

== Warfare ==
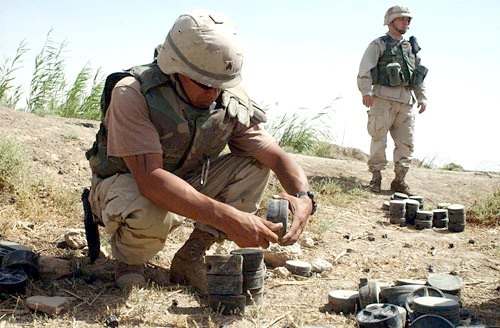
A US Army Explosive Ordnance Disposal technician removing the fuze from a Russian-made mine to clear a minefield outside of Fallujah, Iraq

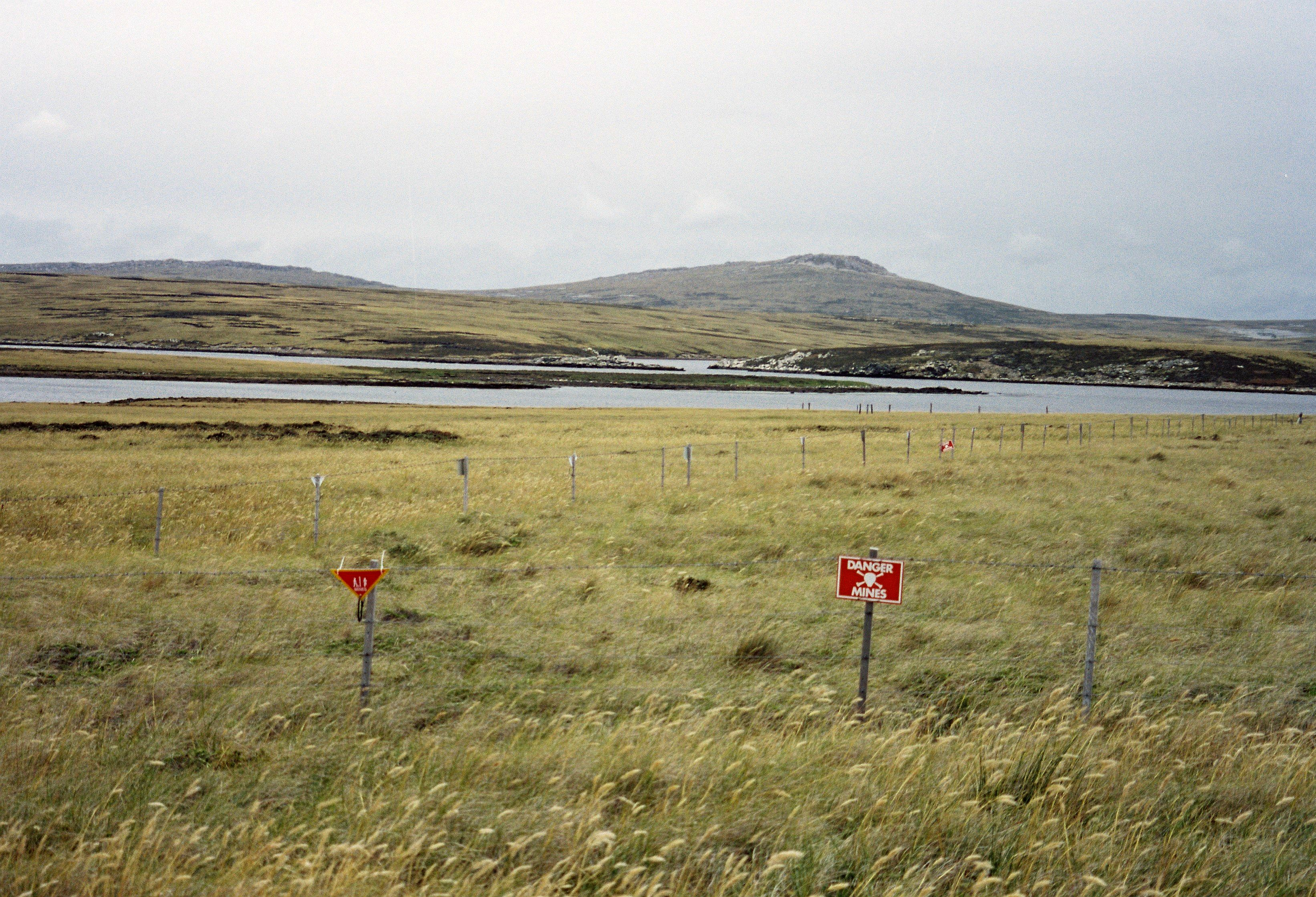
Minefield laid by Argentinian forces in Port William, Falkland Islands in 1982. Demining was inhibited by the boggy terrain

Land mines were designed for two main uses:

- To create defensive tactical barriers, channelling attacking forces into predetermined fire zones or slowing an invading force's progress to allow reinforcements to arrive.
- To act as passive area denial weapons (to deny the enemy use of valuable terrain, resources or facilities when active defense of the area is not desirable or possible).

Land mines are currently used in large quantities mostly for this first purpose, thus their widespread use in the demilitarized zones (DMZs) of likely flashpoints such as Cyprus, Afghanistan and Korea. Syria has used land mines in its civil war. Since 2021, land mine use has risen in Myanmar during its internal conflict. As of 2023, both Russia and Ukraine have deployed land mines in the Russo-Ukrainian war.

In military science, minefields are considered a defensive or harassing weapon, used to slow the enemy down, to deny certain terrain to the enemy, to focus enemy movement into kill zones, or to reduce morale by randomly attacking materiel and personnel. In some engagements during World War II, anti-tank mines accounted for half of all vehicles disabled.

Since combat engineers with mine-clearing equipment can clear a path through a minefield relatively quickly, mines are usually considered effective only if covered by fire.

The extents of minefields are often marked with warning signs and cloth tape, to prevent friendly troops and non-combatants from entering them. Of course, sometimes terrain can be denied using dummy minefields. Most forces carefully record the location and disposition of their own minefields, because warning signs can be destroyed or removed, and minefields should eventually be cleared. Minefields may also have marked or unmarked safe routes to allow friendly movement through them.

Placing minefields without marking and recording them for later removal is considered a war crime under Protocol II of the Convention on Certain Conventional Weapons, which is itself an annex to the Geneva Conventions.

Artillery and aircraft-scatterable mines allow minefields to be placed in front of moving formations of enemy units, including the reinforcement of minefields or other obstacles that have been breached by enemy engineers. They can also be used to cover the retreat of forces disengaging from the enemy, or for interdiction of supporting units to isolate front line units from resupply. In most cases these minefields consist of a combination of anti-tank and anti-personnel mines, with the anti-personnel mines making removal of the anti-tank mines more difficult. Mines of this type used by the United States are designed to self-destruct after a preset period of time, reducing the requirement for mine clearing to only those mines whose self-destruct system did not function. Some designs of these scatterable mines require an electrical charge (capacitor or battery) to detonate. After a certain period of time, either the charge dissipates, leaving them effectively inert or the circuitry is designed such that upon reaching a low level, the device is triggered, destroying the mine.

=== Guerrilla warfare ===
None of the conventional tactics and norms of mine warfare applies when they are employed in a guerrilla role:

- The mines are not used in defensive roles (for specific position or area).
- Mined areas are not marked.
- Mines are usually placed singly and not in groups covering an area.
- Mines are often left unattended (not covered by fire).

Land mines were commonly deployed by insurgents during the South African Border War, leading directly to the development of the first dedicated mine-protected armoured vehicles in South Africa. Namibian insurgents used anti-tank mines to throw South African military convoys into disarray before attacking them. To discourage detection and removal efforts, they also laid anti-personnel mines directly parallel to the anti-tank mines. This initially resulted in heavy South African military and police casualties, as the vast distances of road network vulnerable to insurgent sappers every day made comprehensive detection and clearance efforts impractical. The only other viable option was the adoption of mine-protected vehicles which could remain mobile on the roads with little risk to their passengers even if a mine was detonated. South Africa is widely credited with inventing the v-hull, a vee-shaped hull for armoured vehicles which deflects mine blasts away from the passenger compartment.

During the Syrian Civil War (2011-2025), Iraqi Civil War (2014–2017) and Yemeni Civil War (2015–present) land mines have been used for both defensive and guerrilla purposes.

=== Laying mines ===
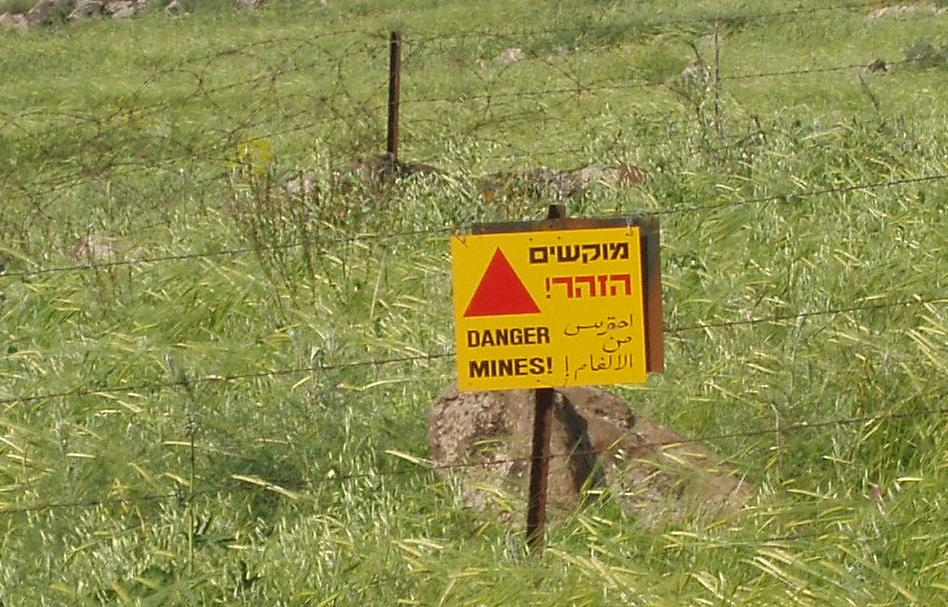
Minefield warning on the Golan Heights, still valid more than 40 years after creation of the field by the Syrian army

Minefields may be laid by several means. The preferred, but most labour-intensive, way is to have engineers bury the mines, since this will make the mines practically invisible and reduce the number of mines needed to deny the enemy an area. Mines can be laid by specialized mine-laying vehicles. Mine-scattering shells may be fired by artillery from a distance of several tens of kilometers.

Mines may be dropped from helicopters or airplanes, or ejected from cluster bombs or cruise missiles.

Anti-tank minefields can be scattered with anti-personnel mines to make clearing them manually more time-consuming; and anti-personnel minefields are scattered with anti-tank mines to prevent the use of armored vehicles to clear them quickly. Some anti-tank mine types are also able to be triggered by infantry, giving them a dual purpose even though their main and official intention is to work as anti-tank weapons.

Some minefields are specifically booby-trapped to make clearing them more dangerous. Mixed anti-personnel and anti-tank minefields, anti-personnel mines under anti-tank mines, and fuses separated from mines have all been used for this purpose. Often, single mines are backed by a secondary device, designed to kill or maim personnel tasked with clearing the mine.

Multiple anti-tank mines have been buried in stacks of two or three with the bottom mine fuzed, to multiply the penetrating power. Since the mines are buried, the ground directs the energy of the blast in a single direction—through the bottom of the target vehicle or on the track.

Another specific use is to mine an aircraft runway immediately after it has been bombed to delay or discourage repair. Some cluster bombs combine these functions. One example was the British JP233 cluster bomb which includes munitions to damage (crater) the runway as well as anti-personnel mines in the same cluster bomb. As a result of the anti-personnel mine ban it was withdrawn from British Royal Air Force service, and the last stockpiles of the mine were destroyed on October 19, 1999.

== Demining ==
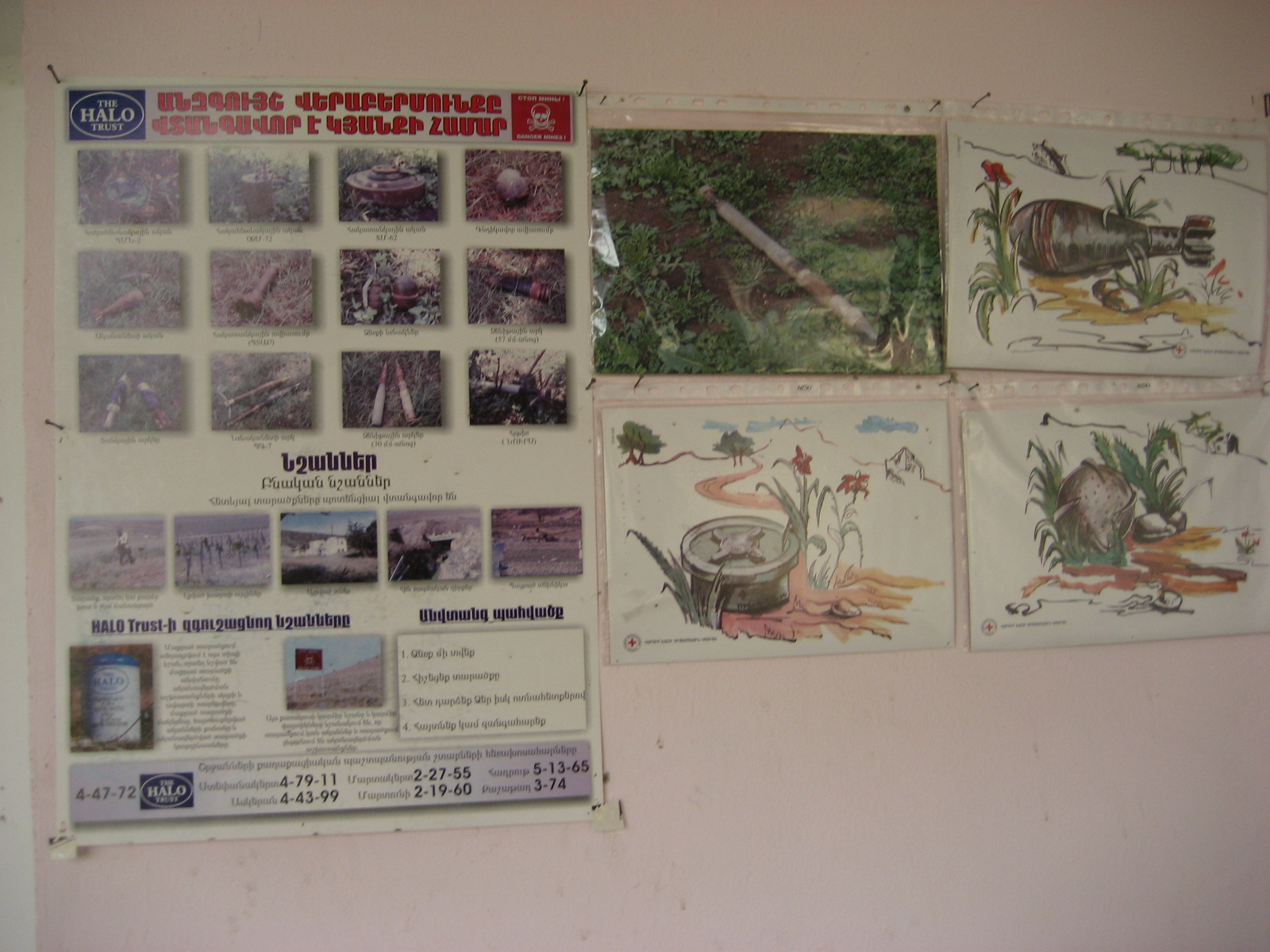
School posters in Karabakh educating children on mines and UXO

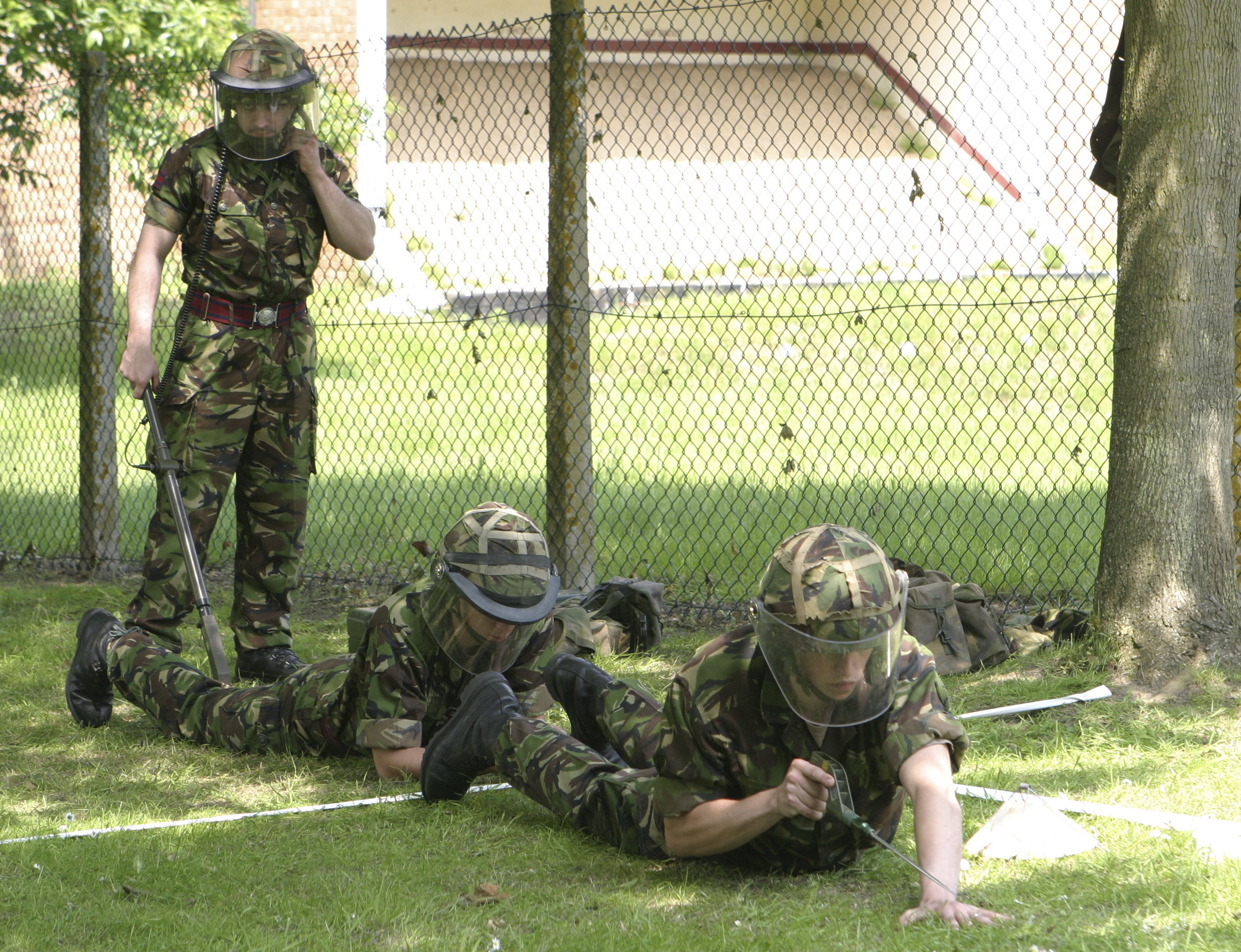
British Royal Engineers practice mine clearance.

Metal detectors were first used for demining, after their invention by the Polish officer Józef Kosacki. His invention, known as the Polish mine detector, was used by the Allies alongside mechanical methods, to clear the German mine fields during the Second Battle of El Alamein when 500 units were shipped to Field Marshal Montgomery's Eighth Army.

The Nazis used captured civilians who were chased across minefields to detonate the explosives. According to Laurence Rees "Curt von Gottberg, the SS-Obergruppenführer who, during 1943, conducted another huge anti-partisan action called Operation Kottbus on the eastern border of Belarus, reported that 'approximately two to three thousand local people were blown up in the clearing of the minefields'."

Whereas the placing and arming of mines is relatively inexpensive and simple, the process of detecting and removing them is typically expensive, slow, and dangerous. This is especially true of irregular warfare where mines were used on an ad hoc basis in unmarked and undocumented areas. Anti-personnel mines are most difficult to find, due to their small size and many being made almost entirely of non-metallic materials specifically to evade metal detectors.

Manual clearing remains the most effective technique for clearing mine fields, although hybrid techniques involving the use of animals and robots are being developed. Many animals are desirable due to having a strong sense of smell capable of detecting a land mine. Animals such as rats and dogs can be trained to detect the explosive agent.

Other techniques involve the use of geolocation technologies. As of 2008 a joint team of researchers at the University of New South Wales and Ohio State University was working to develop a system based on multi-sensor integration. Furthermore, defence firms have been increasingly competing on the creation of unmanned demining systems. In addition to conventional remote control mine defusing robots that operate either through precise mechanical dismantling, electronic destabilization and kinetic triggering methods, fully autonomous methods are in development. Notably, these autonomous methods use unmanned ground systems, or more recently subterranean systems such as the EMC Operations Termite, using either outward pressure differentials along system bodies, or corkscrew mechanisms.

The laying of land mines has inadvertently led to a positive development in the Falkland Islands. Minefields laid near the sea during the Falklands War have become favorite places for penguins, which do not weigh enough to detonate the mines. Therefore, they can breed safely, free of human intrusion. These odd sanctuaries have proven so popular and lucrative for ecotourism that efforts existed to prevent removal of the mines, but the area has since been demined.

== International treaties ==
Party states to the Ottawa Treaty as of 2026 Signed and ratified Acceded or succeeded Withdrawn

The use of land mines is controversial because they are indiscriminate weapons, harming soldier and civilian alike. They remain dangerous after the conflict in which they were deployed has ended, killing and injuring civilians and rendering land impassable and unusable for decades. To make matters worse, many factions have not kept accurate records (or any at all) of the exact locations of their minefields, making removal efforts painstakingly slow. These facts pose serious difficulties in many developing nations where the presence of mines hampers resettlement, agriculture, and tourism. The International Campaign to Ban Landmines campaigned successfully to prohibit their use, culminating in the 1997 Convention on the Prohibition of the Use, Stockpiling, Production and Transfer of Anti-Personnel Mines and on their Destruction, known informally as the Ottawa Treaty.

The Treaty came into force on March 1, 1999. The treaty was the result of the leadership of the Governments of Canada, Norway, South Africa and Mozambique working with the International Campaign to Ban Landmines, launched in 1992. The campaign and its leader, Jody Williams, won the Nobel Peace Prize in 1997 for its efforts.

The treaty does not include anti-tank mines, cluster bombs or Claymore-type mines operated in command mode and focuses specifically on anti-personnel mines, because these pose the greatest long term (post-conflict) risk to humans and animals since they are typically designed to be triggered by any movement or pressure of only a few kilograms, whereas anti-tank mines require much more weight (or a combination of factors that would exclude humans). Existing stocks must be destroyed within four years of signing the treaty.

Signatories of the Ottawa Treaty agree that they will not use, produce, stockpile or trade in anti-personnel land mines. In 1997, there were 122 signatories; as of early 2016, 162 countries have joined the Treaty. Thirty-six countries, including the People's Republic of China, the Russian Federation and the United States, which together may hold tens of millions of stockpiled anti-personnel mines, are not party to the Convention. Another 34 have yet to sign on. The United States did not sign because the treaty lacks an exception for the Korean Demilitarized Zone.

Article 3 of the Treaty permits countries to retain land mines for use in training or development of countermeasures. Sixty-four countries have taken this option.

As an alternative to an outright ban, 10 countries follow regulations that are contained in a 1996 amendment of Protocol II of the Convention on Conventional Weapons (CCW). The countries are China, Finland, India, Israel, Morocco, Pakistan, South Korea and the United States. Sri Lanka, which had adhered to this regulation, announced in 2016 that it would join the Ottawa Treaty.

Submunitions and unexploded ordnance from cluster munitions can also function as land mines, in that they continue to kill and maim indiscriminately long after conflicts have ended. The Convention on Cluster Munitions (CCM) is an international treaty that prohibits the use, distribution, or manufacture of cluster munitions. The CCM entered into force in 2010, and has been ratified by over 100 countries.

== Manufacturers ==
Before the Ottawa Treaty was adopted, the Arms Project of Human Rights Watch identified "almost 100 companies and government agencies in 48 countries" that had manufactured "more than 340 types of anti-personnel land mines in recent decades". Five to ten million mines were produced per year with a value of $50 to $200 million. The largest producers were probably China, Italy and the Soviet Union. The companies involved included giants such as Daimler-Benz, the Fiat Group, the Daewoo Group, RCA and General Electric.

As of 2017, the Landmine & Cluster Munition Monitor identified four countries that were "likely to be actively producing" land mines: India, Myanmar, Pakistan and South Korea. Another seven states reserved the right to make them but were probably not doing so: China, Cuba, Iran, North Korea, Russia, Singapore, and Vietnam.

In recent years, arms industry manufacturers have been using non-static mines that can be specifically targeted in order to remove the imprecision of anti-personnel devices, promoting the use of movable underground systems, movable above ground systems and systems that can be expired (automatically or manually via strategic operators.) Development of systems such as Termite, by arms firm EMC Operations has led to criticism from proponents of past multilateral agreements against the placement of land mines and submunitions due to expectations of similar long-dormancy period issues after systems break or fail after it was announced that vehicles would likely be armed to destroy static targets, rather than focus purely on demining efforts.

== Impacts ==
Throughout the world there are millions of hectares that are contaminated with land mines.

=== Casualties ===
From 1999 to 2017, the Landmine Monitor has recorded over 120,000 casualties from mines, IEDs and ERW; it estimates that another 1,000 per year go unrecorded. The estimate for all time is over half a million. In 2017, at least 2,793 were killed and 4,431 injured. 87% of the casualties were civilians and 47% were children (less than 18 years old). The largest numbers of casualties were in Afghanistan (2,300), Syria (1,906), and Ukraine (429).

=== Environmental ===
Natural disasters can have a significant impact on efforts to demine areas of land. For example, the floods that occurred in Mozambique in 1999 and 2000 may have displaced hundreds of thousands of land mines left from the war. Uncertainty about their locations delayed recovery efforts.

=== Land degradation ===
From a study by Asmeret Asefaw Berhe, land degradation caused by land mines "can be classified into five groups: access denial, loss of biodiversity, micro-relief disruption, chemical composition, and loss of productivity". The effects of an explosion depend on: "(i) the objectives and methodological approaches of the investigation; (ii) concentration of mines in a unit area; (iii) chemical composition and toxicity of the mines; (iv) previous uses of the land and (v) alternatives that are available for the affected populations".

==== Access denial ====
The most prominent ecological issue associated with land mines (or fear of them) is denial of access to vital resources (where "access" refers to the ability to use resources, in contrast to "property", the right to use them). The presence and fear of presence of even a single land mine can discourage access for agriculture, water supplies and possibly conservation measures. Reconstruction and development of important structures such as schools and hospitals are likely to be delayed, and populations may shift to urban areas, increasing overcrowding and the risk of spreading diseases.

Access denial can have positive effects on the environment. When a mined area becomes a "no-man's land", plants and vegetation have a chance to grow and recover. For example, formerly arable lands in Nicaragua returned to forests and remained undisturbed after the establishment of land mines. Similarly, the penguins of the Falkland Islands have benefited because they are not heavy enough to trigger the mines present. However, these benefits can only last as long as animals, tree limbs, etc. do not detonate the mines. In addition, long idle periods could "potentially end up creating or exacerbating loss of productivity", particularly within land of low quality.

==== Loss of biodiversity ====
Land mines can threaten biodiversity by wiping out vegetation and wildlife during explosions or demining. This extra burden can push threatened and endangered species to extinction. They have also been used by poachers to target endangered species. Displaced refugees hunt animals for food and destroy habitat by making shelters.

Shrapnel, or abrasions of bark or roots caused by detonated mines, can cause the slow death of trees and provide entry sites for wood-rotting fungi. When land mines make land unavailable for farming, residents resort to the forests to meet all of their survival needs. This exploitation furthers the loss of biodiversity.

==== Chemical contamination ====
Near mines that have exploded or decayed, soils tend to be contaminated, particularly with heavy metals. Products produced from the explosives, both organic and inorganic substances, are most likely to be "long lasting, water-soluble and toxic even in small amounts". They can be implemented either "directly or indirectly into soil, water bodies, microorganisms and plants with drinking water, food products or during respiration".

Toxic compounds can also find their way into bodies of water and accumulate in land animals, fish and plants. They can act "as a nerve poison to hamper growth", with deadly effect.

=== Economic ===
A 2025 study in Econometrica, which examined landmine removal in Mozambique, found substantial economic benefits from landmine removal, in particular in areas where the mines affected roads and railroads.

== See also ==
- Convention on Cluster Munitions
- Countermine System
- Demolition belt
- List of global issues
- Mine Protected Vehicle
- Unexploded ordnance (UXO)
- Improvised explosive device
- TM 31-210 Improvised Munitions Handbook

Mines

- Anti-personnel mine
- ARGES mine
- Blast resistant mine
- Intelligent Munitions System
- List of land mines
- LPZ mine
- Minimum metal mine
- PFM-1
- Smart mine
- Wooden box mine
- Bulgarian anti-helicopter mines

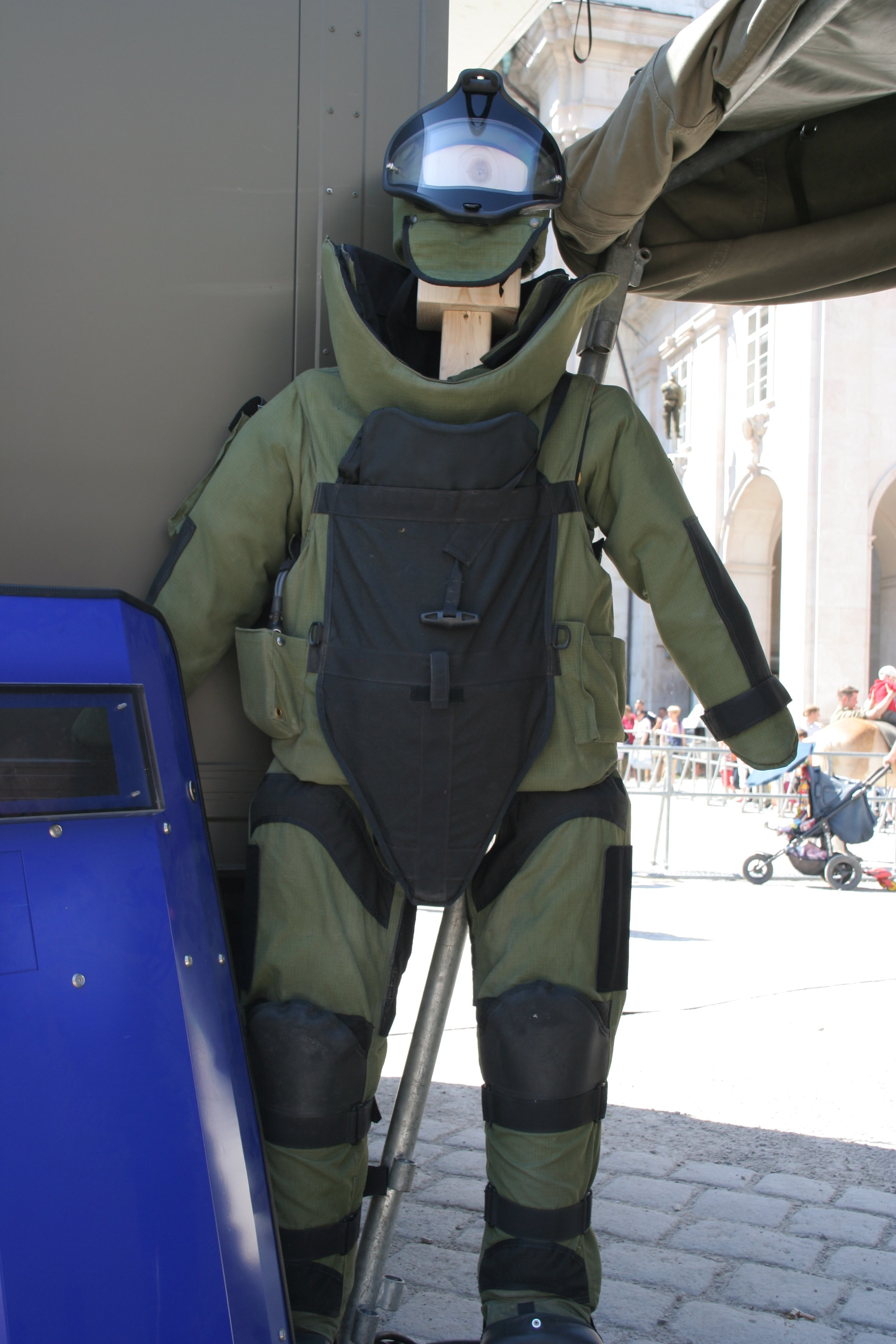
Bomb disposal Advanced Bomb Suit

Places

- Land mines in Latin America and the Caribbean
- Land mines in Cambodia
- Landmines in Israel
- Land mines in North Africa
- Uzbek-Tajikistan border minefields

Organisations

- Mines Advisory Group (MAG)
- Mine clearance agencies
