= 4M Defense =

Israeli demining company

4M Defense Ltd.
- Native name: פור אם דיפנס
- Type: Subsidiary
- Industry: Defense technology, Demining, explosive ordnance disposal
- Founded: 2012
- Founders: Nir Cohen, Itzik Malka
- Headquarters: Ra'anana, Israel
- Key people: Nir Cohen (CEO)
- Parent: Ondas Defense
- Website: 4-mine.com

4M Defense Ltd. (Hebrew: פור אם דיפנס) is an Israeli company engaged in clearing landmines, unexploded ordnance and other explosive remnants of war, handling improvised explosive device scenes, supporting weapons trials and carrying out controlled detonations, including survey of suspected hazardous areas and manual and mechanical clearance. The company combines mapping and robotics capabilities and operates in war-affected areas, using robotic systems to clear dangerous ordnance.

It was founded in 2012 by Nir Cohen and Itzik Malka, former officers of the Yahalom unit of the Combat Engineering Corps, and is based in Ra'anana. It is one of the civilian companies carrying out mine and unexploded ordnance clearance in Israel under contract with the Israel National Mine Action Authority (INMAA) of the Ministry of Defense. In October 2025, 4M Defense was acquired by the American company Ondas Defense.

== History ==
The company was founded in 2012. In the Israeli Registrar of Companies, 4M Defense Ltd. is registered as a private company incorporated on 18 February 2016.

The founders, Nir Cohen and Itzik Malka, served as officers in the Yahalom unit. According to a 2021 article in Globes, Cohen left a position at Elbit Systems for the venture, and Malka had served in the unit for about a decade. The two began as subcontractors on clearance tasks in unusual terrain, and their clearance company later became a prime contractor of the Israeli Ministry of Defense in the field.

In June 2020 the sister company 4M Analytics shifted its focus to mapping underground infrastructure, backed by broad venture capital investment, including from Viola Ventures, Insight Partners, F2 Capital and ITI.

In 2022-2023, 4M won mine clearance contracts from the INMAA.

== Ownership ==
In October 2025 the American company Ondas Holdings (renamed Ondas Inc. in January 2026) agreed to buy from the founders, Nir Cohen and Itzik Malka, 70% of the holding company that owns 4M Defense, for a total of US$8.4 million: US$2.4 million in cash and the rest in Ondas shares. The deal closed on 29 October 2025.

In March 2026 the remaining 30% was acquired at a company valuation of US$17 million.

== Operations ==
The company surveys areas suspected of contamination and clears mines and unexploded ordnance by manual and mechanical methods. According to the company, its services also include risk mapping based on non-technical survey and data analysis, planning advice for governments, non-governmental organizations and commercial clients, and training programs for national authorities and field operators. The company operates a data-fusion platform that combines satellite imagery, drone mapping and historical threat data to locate mines and unexploded ordnance, as well as ground and subsurface robotic demining systems. Its Nexus robotic systems are designed for fully robotic clearance, without human contact with the ordnance.

In February 2026 the company was awarded a multi-year demining program worth more than US$30 million along the Israel-Syria border. In March 2026 it received an order of US$15.8 million under the program.

In April 2026 the company won a tender for mine clearance along Israel's border with Jordan, in the section between Hamat Gader and Eilat, ahead of the construction of the Ministry of Defense's eastern border security barrier. The clearance work uses autonomous ground robotic systems, drone mapping and AI-based data processing.

== See also ==
- Land mines in Israel
