= Holzmine 42 =

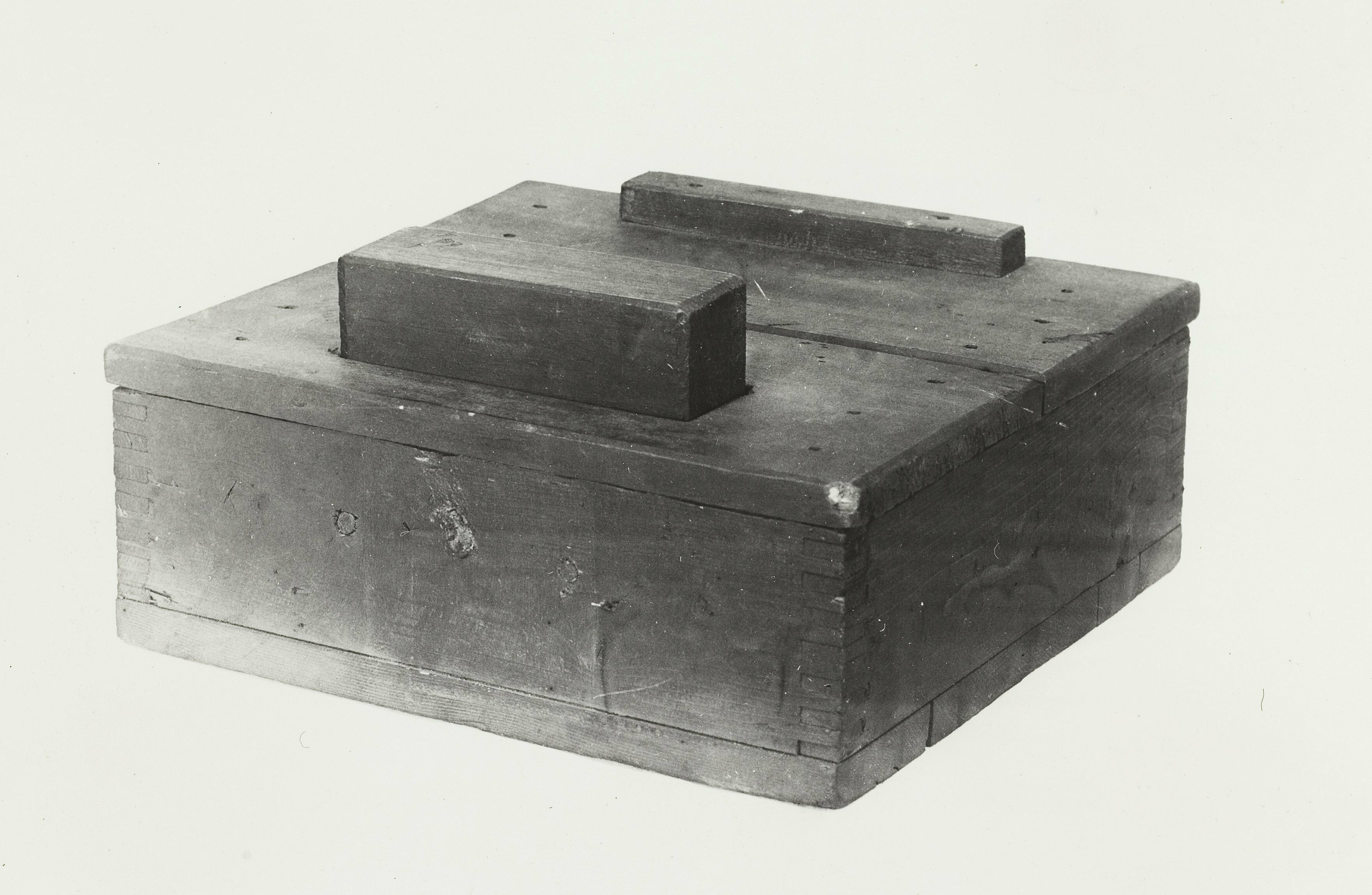
- Type: Anti-tank mine
- Place of origin: Germany

Service history
- In service: 1942-1945
- Used by: Wehrmacht
- Wars: World War II

Production history
- No. built: 5,000,000

Specifications
- Mass: 8.2 kg (18 lb)
- Length: 31 cm (12.2 in)
- Width: 31 cm (12.2 in)
- Height: 12 cm (4.7 in)
- Filling: Amatol
- Filling weight: 5 kg (11 lb)

The Holzmine 42 was an anti-tank mine that was developed by Germany and used by the Wehrmacht during World War II.

== Design ==
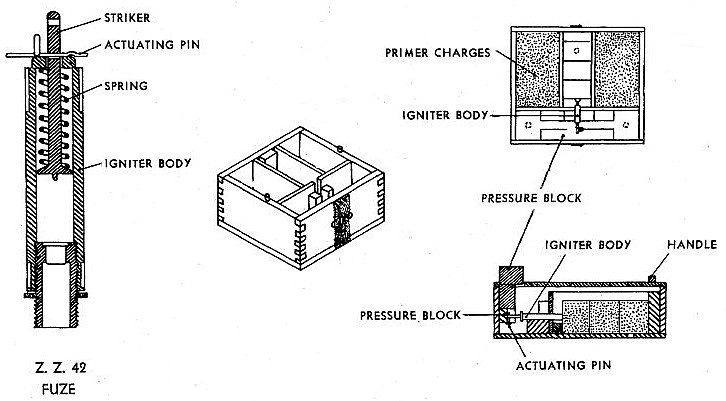
A schematic of components.

The Holzmine 42 was designed to be a low cost, and easy to produce anti-tank mine which could utilize the woodworking industry while relieving pressure on the overstretched metalworking industry. An advantage of a wooden mine is that it is hard to detect with metal detectors since there are few metal components but in wet conditions, the wood could rot and the explosives could become wet.

The body of the Holzmine 42 consisted of a wooden box divided into four compartments by with removable partitions. The two side compartments contained the main explosive filling of 5.4 kg (12 lb) Amatol that was waterproofed with bitumen, while the center compartment contained three 200 g (7 oz) waterproofed primer charges, and the end compartment contained the operating mechanism. The end compartment contained a rectangular shearing flange secured to the outside wall of the box by two 9.52 mm (0.375 in) wooden dowels and a pressure of approximately 91 kg (200 lb) sheared the dowels and forced the flange down onto the igniter pin and freeing the spring-loaded striker. The Holzmine 42 could also be fitted with an anti-tamper device which consisted of a Z. Z. 35 fuze that screwed into a hole in the bottom of the box which connected to one of the primer charges.

== Similar mines ==
- Panssarimiina m/44 - Finnish anti-tank mine.
- CC 48 mine - Italian anti-tank mine.
- YaM-5 box mine - Soviet anti-tank mine.
