= M44 =

M44 or M-44 may refer to:

== Transportation ==
- BMW M44, an inline 4 gasoline engine produced by BMW
- M-44 (Michigan highway), a state highway in Michigan
- M44 (Cape Town), a Metropolitan Route in Cape Town, South Africa
- M44 (Johannesburg), a Metropolitan Route in Johannesburg, South Africa
- M44 motorway (Hungary), an under-construction motorway
- MÁV Class M44, the Polish code-name for a Hungarian shunting diesel locomotive

== Weaponry ==
- 44M Tas, a Hungarian medium/heavy tank design of World War II
- ALFA M44, a Spanish machine gun developed during World War II
- Hungarian 44M, an unguided anti-tank rocket designed by Hungary in World War II
- M44 generator cluster, an American chemical cluster bomb
- M44 self-propelled howitzer, 1950s US self-propelled 155 mm artillery
- Panssarimiina m/44, a Finnish anti-tank blast mine
- KP m/44, a Finnish submachine gun
- A model of the Mosin–Nagant, a Russian bolt-action rifle
- A Yugoslav People's Army's internal designation of SU-100 self-propelled gun

== Other uses ==
- IBM M44/44X, an experimental IBM mainframe from the 1960s
- M44 (cyanide device), a device used to poison predators
- Messier 44 (M44), an open star cluster also called the Beehive Cluster
- Progress M-44, a spacecraft used to resupply the International Space Station
- USS Vigor (AM-473), a U.S. Navy Agile-class minesweeper
- The 44th Mersenne prime
