= CIGI =

CIGI can refer to:

- Carrabba's Italian Grill Inc., a chain of over 200 Italian-style restaurants in the USA
- Centre for International Governance Innovation
- Colliers International Group Inc., a Canada-based real estate services firm
- Common Image Generator Interface
- Consolidated Industrial Gases, Inc., a member of the Linde Group, the leading industrial gas company in the Philippines.
