= Fiat Multiplay =

Fiat 2026 concept car

- Multiplay in 2026

Overview
- Manufacturer: Fiat
- Designer: Centro Stile Fiat

Body and chassis
- Class: Concept car
- Body style: 5-door MPV

Dimensions
- Length: 4,450 millimetres (175.2 in)

The Fiat Multiplay is a 2026 concept car unveiled by FIAT at the 2026 Paris Motor Show. Fiat has reinvented the 1998 Multipla MPV as a cross between a pick-up truck and an SUV. At 4.45 meters long, the concept combines the space efficiency of an MPV, the character of an SUV and the versatility of a pick-up.

Fiat's Multiplay is the MPV alternative to the upcoming Grizzly SUV twins. The Mutiplay's form is the classic monospace shape, with the windscreen pushed forward to create a 'one-box' design like a van's.

The car can be converted from a people carrier to a pick-up electronically. The rearmost side windows drop as the section aft of the C-pillar slides to join the main roof panel. Meanwhile, the rearmost seats slide forward to meet the second row. The parcel shelf automatically then folds into the rear window, opening the boot to the elements for easier stowage and removal of large items.

Closed roof

Side view

Interior
