= MPV =

MPV or mpv may refer to:

== Vehicles ==
=== Road ===
- Multi-purpose vehicle, or minivan, a type of van designed for private use
  - Compact MPV, a mid-size MPV
  - Mini MPV, a compact MPV
- Mazda MPV, or Ɛ̃fini MPV, a car model

=== Rail ===
- Windhoff MPV, a multi-unit train for infrastructure maintenance
  - British Rail MPV, a Windoff MPV version used in the United Kingdom

=== Maritime ===
- Multi-purpose vessel, a ship built to carry a range of cargoes

=== Military ===
- Mine Protected Vehicle (disambiguation)
  - Mahindra Mine Protected Vehicle, an Indian armored personnel carrier
  - Okapi MPV, a South African mine-protected vehicle

== Computer software ==
- mpv (media player), a command-line, audio/video playback program
- Multi-Purpose Viewer, an image generator for high-end simulators

== Science and medicine ==
- Mean platelet volume, in blood testing, a measure of platelet size
- Meerwein–Ponndorf–Verley reduction, a chemical reaction reducing ketones and aldehydes
- Monkeypox virus, a pathogen of humans and other euarchontoglires

== Other uses ==
- Muslims for Progressive Values, a faith-based human rights organization
- Mungkip language (ISO 639-3 code: mpv)
