= M1 chemical mine =

US chemical landmine developed in 1939

The M1 was a United States chemical landmine. It was developed in 1939, and consisted of a one-gallon (4.5 liter) gasoline can filled with 9.9 lbs (4.5 kg) of mustard gas agent. As issued, it had no bursting charge or fuze, but required a bursting charge of detonating cord to be attached via soldered tabs on the outside of the can.
