= Land mines in Israel =

Landmines in Israel have been a problem since the 1950s and 1960s. Campaigns to clear the landmines, led by a coalition of civil-society organizations, mine-affected communities and land mine survivors, operated from 2009 to 2011, until the Knesset passed the Minefield Clearance Act. According to this law, the Israel Mine Action Authority was established and began clearing minefields in 2012.

== History ==
Around 1.2 million land mines laid during the 1950s and 1960s contaminate a combined area of 50,000 acres in the Golan Heights, in the Arava Valley and along the Jordan River. This includes more than 300,000 land mines contaminating 5,000 acres of agricultural and residential land in the West Bank, with unexploded ordnance further making sites inaccessible. A State Comptroller audit conducted in the late 1990s found that hundreds of minefields no longer contributed to Israel's security and that no government agency had presented a plan to clear them.

== Legislation ==
Three unsuccessful attempts to offer a legal solution to the land mine problem were proposed in the early 2000s. In 2009, Jerry White, an American who survived a mine incident in the Golan Heights, together with the newly formed Mine-Free Israel coalition, led by activist Dhyan Or, drafted a call to action and a legal framework for humanitarian demining in Israel. In February 2010, 11-year-old Israeli boy Daniel Yuval lost his leg to land mine while walking in the snow in the Golan Heights. Following this incident, Yuval joined the Mine-Free Israel and petitioned the Prime Minister and Members of Knesset to support the draft bill. The campaign secured the support of 73 Members of Knesset, as well as the Government, and became a law on March 14, 2011.

== Demining ==
Following the adoption of the bill, the State of Israel established its National Mine Action Authority, which began work in the Arava Valley in 2012. In 2013, demining activity continued in the Arava and spread to the West Bank and the Golan Heights.

According to the 2021 Mine Action Review, there were 262,278 mi^{2} mined areas in the West Bank excluding the Jordan Valley. From 2016 to 2020, a total of 113,380 mi^{2} were cleared, but Israel is not projected to meet the Article 5 target deadline of June 1, 2028.

In January 2026 Israeli authorities launched a $1.5 billion mine clearing project along the border with Jordan, clearing at least three minefields. At the same time, it actively cleared areas along the Sea of Galilee from suspected mines.
