= Bulgarian anti-helicopter mines =

Series of land mines

The 4AHM-100, AHM-200, AHM-200-1, AHM-200-2, PMN-150, and PMN-250 are Bulgarian directional fragmentation mines that can be used with proximity fuzes to function as anti-helicopter mines.

== Description ==
The systems were developed by the Bulgarian Institute of Metal Science, and are based around electronic fuzes with broadly similar functionality. The fuzes use two sensors. The first, an acoustic sensor, arms the mine as a helicopter approaches. The second sensor is a radar, which locates the target and triggers the mine at the appropriate point. The mines all use a number of large Misnay-Schardin effect warheads to project large numbers of fragments to an effective range of around 200 meters. Jane's Mines and Mine Clearance speculates that IFF could be integrated into the fuze circuit to discriminate against friendly aircraft, lowering the chances of friendly fire.

== Mines ==
=== PMN-150 and PMN-250 ===
The PMN-150 and PMN-250 are large directional fragmentation mines that scatter fragments in a 60 degree horizontal arc. The PMN-150 produces approximately 1,500 fragments that have an effective range of 150 meters. The PMN-250 is a larger mine which produces 2,100 fragments that have an effective range of 250 meters. The mines have a number of electronic fuzes available including three microwave fuzes, an acoustic fuze and a seismic sensor. The mines can be remotely triggered or deactivated.

=== Anti-Transport Mine ===
The "Anti-Transport Mine" is a large circular directional fragmentation mine that uses an internal fragmentation matrix and five Misnay-Schardin plates. The fragmentation matrix produces a large number of small fragments, and the Misnay–Schardin plates produce large fragments that can penetrate armoured vehicles.

The mine appears to be based on the PMN-250 mine, and the mine is likely to have an effective range of 250 meters.

=== 4AHM-100 ===
The 4AHM-100 uses four 30 kilogram mines with a single central sensor. The mines are triggered simultaneously when the sensor detects a target inside the effective footprint of the mines. The mine is currently at the prototype stage.

=== AHM-200 ===
The AHM-200 weighs 35 kilograms and contains 12 kilograms of TNT. The mine's warhead has two sections, a large rectangular warhead with a pre-notched fragmentation liner that produces 1,960 fragments, and a secondary warhead with five Misnay–Schardin plates that produce large self-forging fragments. The fragments scatter in an arc of 20 degrees to an effective range of 200 meters, and will penetrate 10 millimeters of armour at 100 meters.

=== AHM-200-1 ===
The AHM-200-1 weighs 90 kilograms. Like the AHM-200 it consists of two sections, a large circular fragmentation warhead with a filling of ball bearings, and a horizontal section with five Misnay–Schardin effect plate charges. The two sections are mounted on a sturdy tripod with a sensor mounted above that contains a Doppler radar fuze and an acoustic fuze. The mine has an effective range of about 100 meters.

=== AHM-200-2 ===
The AHM-200-2 weighs 90 kilograms, and is similar to the AHM-200-1, except that it uses a rectangular fragmentation warhead that produces 1,960 fragments.
