= Mine Protected Vehicle =

Mine Protected Vehicle may refer to:

- Armoured personnel carrier
- Medium Mine Protected Vehicle
- Mahindra Mine Protected Vehicle (MPV-I)
- MRAP (Mine-Resistant Ambush Protected)

== See also ==
- V-hull
- Land mine
