= No 6 AP mine =

Anti-personnel mine

The No 6 is a British minimum metal anti-personnel mine. The mine is a long thin cylinder with a tapered bottom and a three pronged trigger on the top. A metal safety clip prevents the mine being triggered before it is armed. A detector ring can be fitted around the middle of the mine. Sufficient pressure on the prongs will break a sheer ring, and release the striker, triggering the mine.

The mine is now obsolete, and has been withdrawn from UK service and all stockpiles have been destroyed.

== Specifications ==
- Diameter: 40 mm
- Height: 190 mm
- Weight: 227 g
- Explosive content: 141 g of TNT
- Operating pressure: 22 kg
