= CC 48 mine =

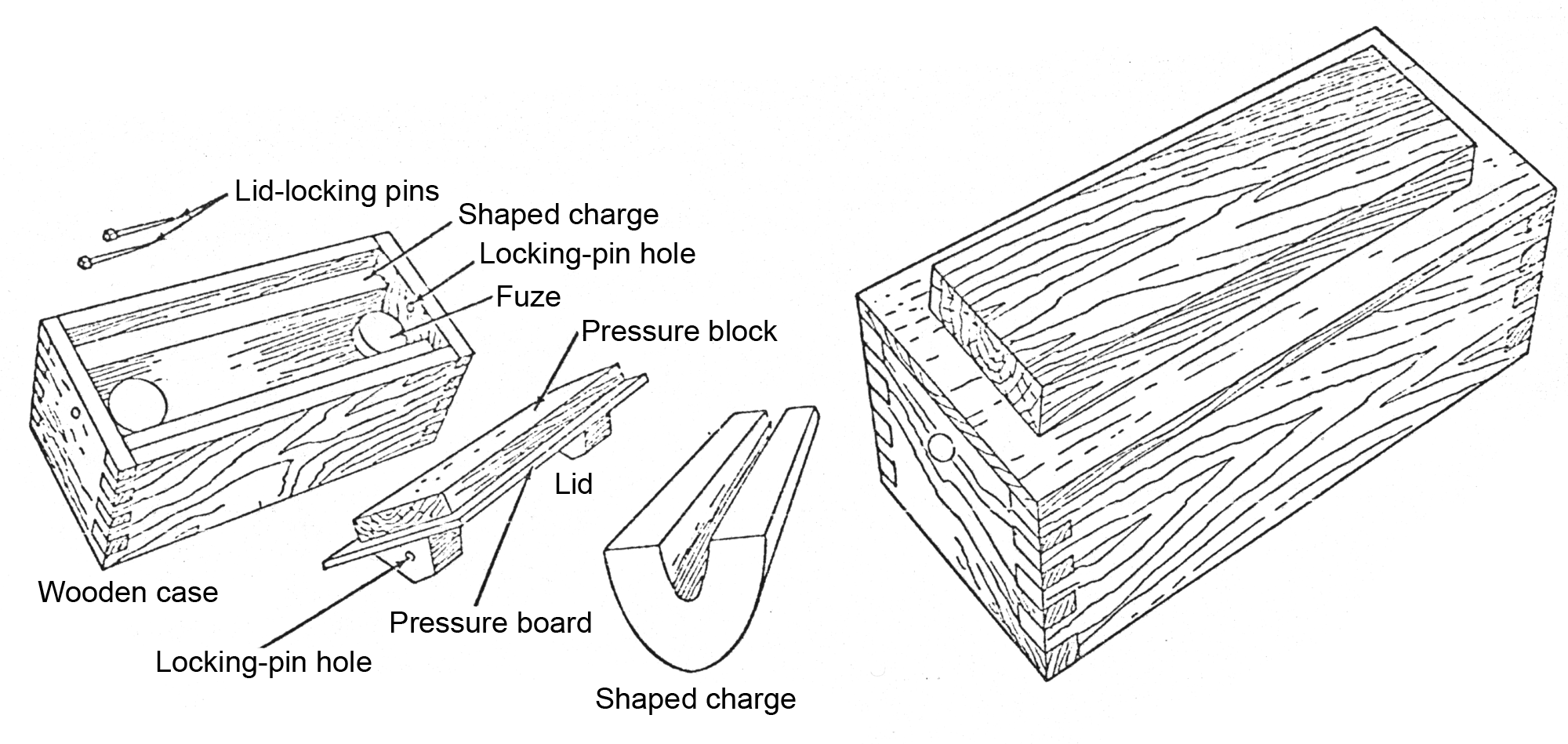
A diagram of a CC 48 landmine, showing the lid removed, revealing the two pressure fuzes embedded in the TNT shaped charge.

The CC 48 is an Italian wooden cased minimum metal anti-tank mine that was used during the Second World War. The mine uses a shaped TNT explosive charge to produce a directional cutting effect. The mine uses two PMC/43 fuzes, but these can be replaced with PMC/42/2 anti-personnel fuzes, combined with weakening the lid this can make it sensitive enough to be detonated by the weight of a mine.

The mines were normally laid between 3.5 and 1.8 meters apart, any closer would trigger sympathetic detonation.

== Specifications ==
- Length: 0.28 m
- Width: 0.13 m
- Height: 0.14 m
- Operating pressure: 220 lbs
- Explosive content: 4 lbs of cast TNT
