= No 7 Mk1 Dingbat mine =

Anti-personnel mine

The No 7 Mk 1 Dingbat mine is a British anti-personnel blast mine. The mine has a steel body, with a flexible pressure pad on the top surface. Under the pressure pad is a belleville spring with a central striker. The fuse is slid into the side of the mine, a firing pin prevents the fuse being fully inserted until it is removed. The mine was intended to be scattered mechanically, and a number of systems were tested to scatter it. However, none were accepted into service, so the Dingbat mine was hand laid instead. The mine came with a small fabric cover to help hide it.

The United Kingdom destroyed the majority of its inventory of anti-personnel mines under the terms of the Anti-Personnel Mine Ban Convention. In a report to the Convention in April 2015 it declared that it retains 724 foreign manufactured anti-personnel mines solely for training and development of mine detection and clearance techniques as permitted by the treaty.

== Specifications ==
- Diameter: 57 mm
- Height: 32 mm
- Weight: 113 g
- Explosive content: 56.7 g of Tetryl
- Operating pressure: 11 kg to 15 kg
