= Land mines in North Africa =

The majority of land mines in North Africa are the product of the North African campaign during World War II and remain a hazard decades later. Later conflicts, including the 1977 Libyan-Egyptian War and the 2011 Libyan civil war, further exacerbated this problem.

== History ==
On 10 June 1940, during World War II, Italy declared war on Great Britain and France. This declaration included the Italian colonies and colonists already located in Africa. The Italians initially attacked Egypt, and the British, allied to the Egyptians by the 1936 treaty, counterattacked and occupied Cyrenaica. The Italians asked for help from their German allies; as a result, the Germans entered the North African theatre of war. The war continued with no decisive victory until the German-Italian forces were defeated at the Second Battle of Alamein in late 1942. German-Italian forces withdrew from Egypt and Libya to Tunisia, and the Americans arrived in North Africa on 8 November 1942, during Operation Torch to assist the British. American and British forces defeated their opponents on 12 May 1943, ending the North African campaign.

During the war, each side used land-mines to impede the enemy's progress. While it is unknown how many mines were used throughout North Africa, it is known from the memoirs of Erwin Rommel that some 80,000 mines were laid at the Buerat-Line in Libya.

Many of the mines are still operational and pose a risk to local populations. The responsibility for removing them has been left to the governments of North African nations.

== Egypt ==
One of the United Nations's missions estimated there are 19.7 million mines in the western desert of Egypt. Great efforts have been made in extracting mines. In a 1997 interview with Major-General Ibrahim Abdul-Fattah, chief of military engineers in the Egyptian armed forces. He stated that 8,301 Egyptian persons (civilian and military) were affected by land mines by 1997. Of them, 7,611 were wounded and 690 were killed. In order to remove the mines, Italian and German old battlefield maps (the German records are more complete) are used in combination with satellite maps to pinpoint dangerous areas. The old maps are not enough because, according to the scientist Ayman Shabana, "many mines have moved due to floods, climate changes or the movement of sand dunes over half a century."

== Libya ==
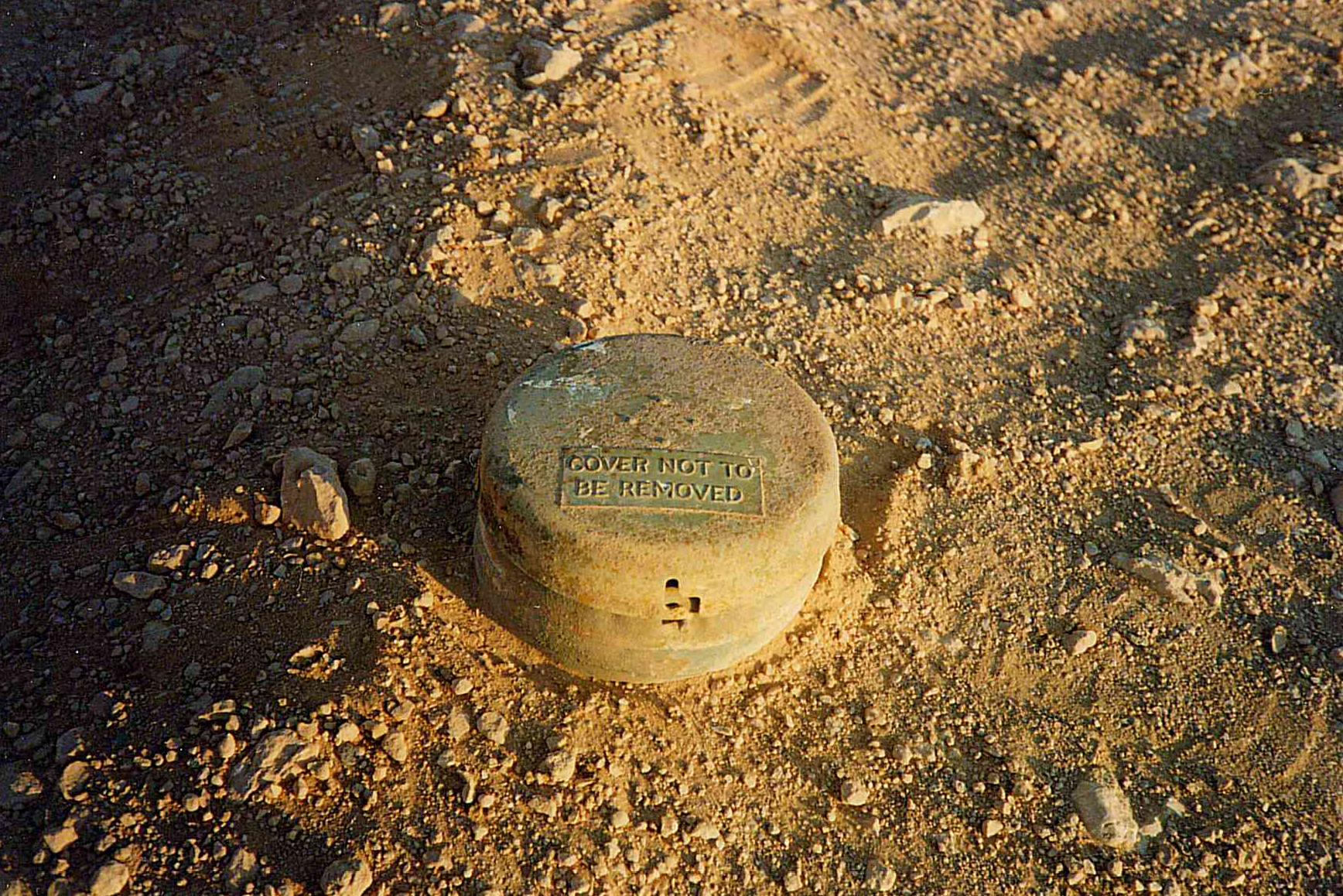
Land mine from WW II at Bir Hakeim, Libya

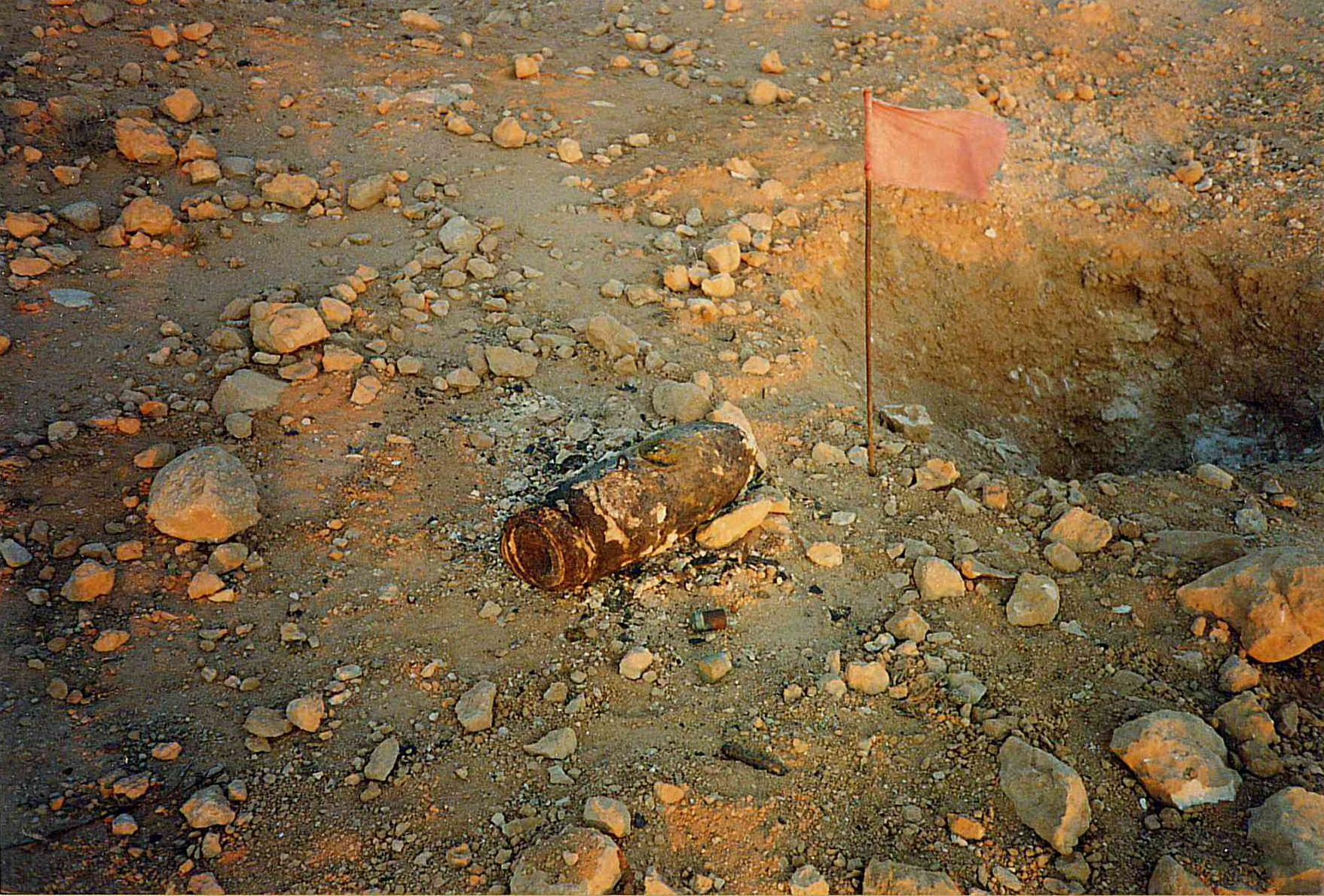
Defused dud near Bir Hakeim, Libya

The White Book, issued by the Libyan government in 1981, shows that for every year from 1939 (before the war) to 1975, Libyans were killed by the explosion of left-over military munitions (including mines), except for the years 1969–70. 1945 had the deadliest record of 130 people killed. Most mine fields are located in the coastal area, the most populated zone of the country.

Libya also has a bad heritage of land mines from the Libyan-Egyptian war in 1977. Many mines laid in Libya during the war remained there as late as 2006. During the Libyan civil war in 2011, Muammar al Qadafi's regime laid land mines to check the advance of the rebel forces.

In the 1990s, about a dozen explosives removal teams worked in the former battle fields in Libya to defuse land mines and duds. Since European countries were unwilling to assist with the removal of these explosives, the Libyan government was forced to cover the expenses for this dangerous work.

== Tunisia ==
"On March 17 [1943] General George S. Patton captured Gafsa. On April 8 he joined up with the 8th Army, whilst on his left, the French XIX Corps moved towards the Eastern Dorsale. But neither of them were able to intercept the Italian army as it retreated north towards Enfidaville via Sfax and Sousse. This was because of the vast numbers of land-mines that Italian and German sappers laid, one of which killed Major-General Edouard Welvert, commanding the "Constantine" Motorised Division, as they were entering Kairouan".

Today, the Tunisian Army is extracting between 200 and 300 mines every year.

== Western Sahara ==
Morocco has constructed a 2,700 km (1,700 mi) long berm (sand wall) cutting through the length of Western Sahara. Minefields and watchtowers serve to separate the Moroccan-controlled zone from the sparsely populated Free Zone. Several thousand people have been killed or injured as a result of stepping on land mines, as have numerous Sahrawi livestock (goats and camels).

== Diplomatic efforts ==
Although these three countries suffer from the same problem, they have never unified their diplomatic engagements with the formerly belligerent countries, Italy, Germany, and Great Britain. This weakened their positions in demanding the extraction of the mines, and compensation for war damages. Libya and Egypt work apart. Tunisia signed the Ottawa Treaty in December 1997, calling for banning the use of mines in warfare.
