= YaM-5 box mine =

Soviet anti-tank land mine

A diagram of a YaM-5 anti-tank mine from a US army publication. 1 - pressure block, 2 - staple, 3 - wooden peg or nail, 4 - striker-retaining pin, 5 - overlapping edge of lid, 6 - paper wrapped explosive, 7 - fuze holder block, 8 - fuze well, 9 - booster charge

The YaM-5 (anti-tank mine 5 kilograms) was a Soviet anti-tank blast mine with a wooden case. The mine was widely used during Great Patriotic War. Wood was chosen as primary material for its availability, cheapness and ease of handling; for example, in 1942, many thousand of such cases were produced at Tuymen Plywood Factory by patriotic young volunteers as an after-school activity. Various types of wood were used.

The mine consists of a rectangular wooden box with a hinged lid that overlaps the front of the mine. A slot in the hinged lid's side through which an MUV pull fuse is placed. A wooden pressure bar is sometimes used on the edge of the lid above the slot. A nail is placed horizontally through the loop of the MUV fuse's striker retaining pin and two loops on the bottom of the lid's slot.

A YaM-10 was also produced; it was a scaled-up version of the YaM-5.

The wooden case was normally painted olive green, gray or white.

The mine was frequently used with anti-handling devices.

Downward pressure on the lid forced the nail downwards; withdrawing the striker retaining pin detonated the mine.

== Specifications ==
	YaM-5	YaM-5K	YaM-5M	YaM-5U	YaM-10
Length	19.5 inches	23.6 inches	19.5 inches	19.75 inches	
Width	7.75 inches	6.9 inches	7.6 inches	7.6 inches	
Height	3.5 inches	6.4 inches	6.4 inches	6.4 inches	
Weight	14 lb	16 lb	16 lb	14 lb	22 to 27 lb
Explosive content	11 lb				16 to 22 lb
Operating pressure	300 lb				
Notes	No pressure block on lid	Long pressure block	Short pressure block	Long pressure block	Larger version of the mine
