= LPZ mine =

German anti-tank mine

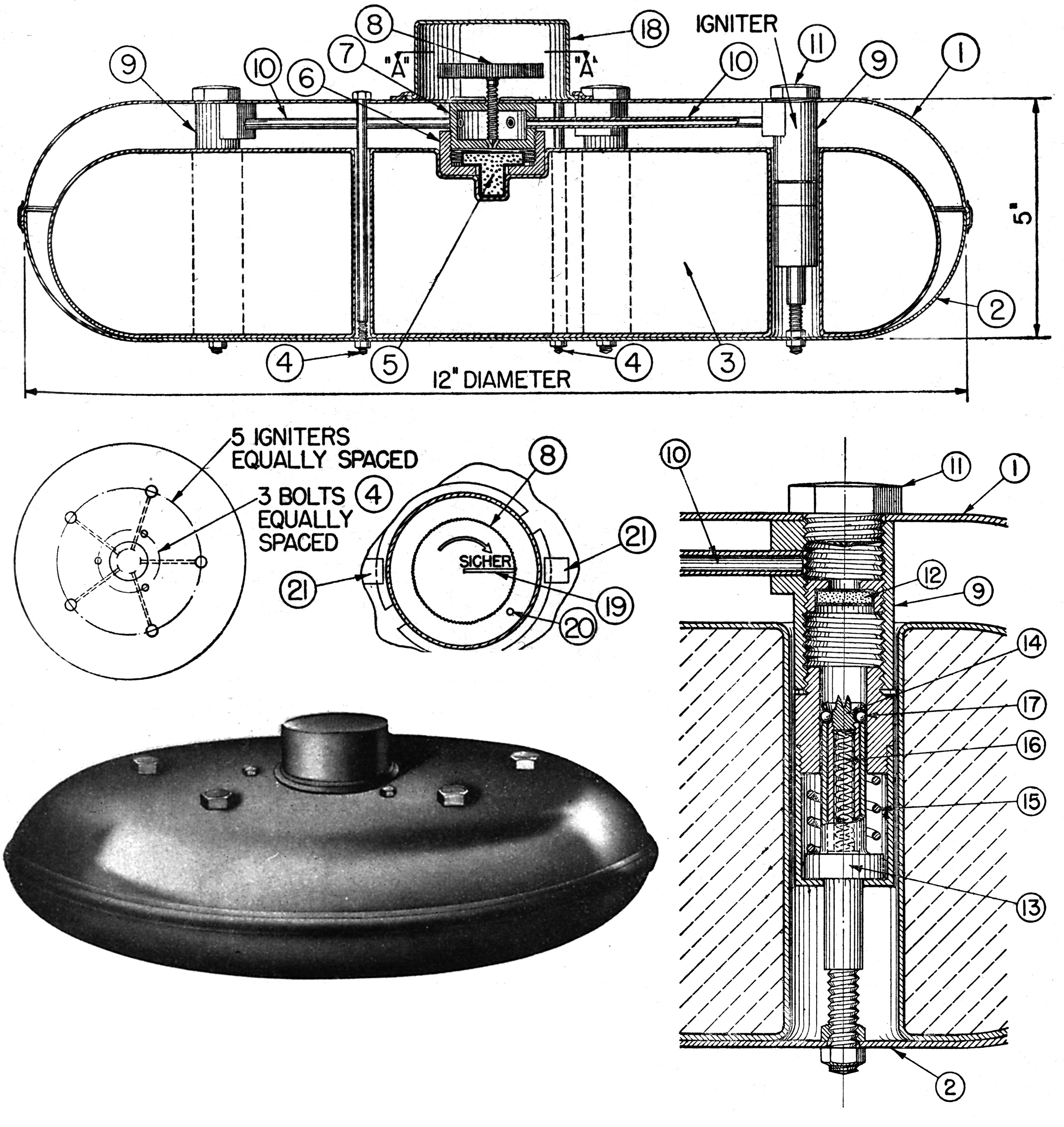
A German L.P.Z. (Light Panzermine).: 1. Top cover; 2. Bottom cover; 3. Explosive charge; 4. Three cover retaining bolts; 5. Detonator; 6. Metal detonator retaining collar; 7. Flash chamber; 8. Safety screw; 9. Igniter tube; 10. Flame tube; 11. Igniter retaining bolt; 12. Percussion cap; 13. Plunger; 14. Striker; 15. Igniter compression spring; 16. Striker spring; 17. Striker retaining steel balls; 18. Safety screw cap; 19. White radial line; 20. White spot; 21. Bayonet catches

The L.P.Z. mine or Leichte Panzermine (Light tank-mine) was a circular, metal-cased German anti-tank mine produced during the Second World War. The mine was accepted into service in 1941, and were intended for use by Paratroops. Production of the mine ended in 1942 with only 31,700 mines produced. The mines were first used during Operation Merkur, the airborne invasion of Crete and were still in use at the end of the war.

The mine is circular and has a very rounded appearance, with a central metal cap that covers the mine's safety device, a large screw. The mine is unusual in that it uses five igniter/fuzes linked to a central detonator by a series of flame tubes. Sufficient pressure on the top surface of the mine causes it to press down on one or more of the igniters, compressing a spring and allowing two steel striker retaining balls to escape, releasing the striker, which is forced upwards by a second spring. The striker hits a percussion cap at the top of the igniter, the flash from which travels along a flame tube to a metal chamber in the centre of the mine. If the safety screw is removed then the flash is free to ignite the detonator, which in turn detonates the main charge.

== Specifications ==
- Diameter: Reported as either 263 mm or 300 mm
- Height: Reported as either 125 mm or 90 mm (not including fuze)
- Weight: 4.1 kg
- Explosive content: 2.3 kg of TNT
- Operating pressure: 250 kg approx
