= Common Image Generator Interface =

The Common Image Generator Interface (CIGI) (pronounced sig-ee), is an on-the-wire data protocol that allows communication between an Image Generator and its host simulation. The interface is designed to promote a standard way for a host device to communicate with an image generator (IG) within the industry.

CIGI enables plug-and-play by standard-compliant image generator vendors and reduces integration costs when upgrading visual systems.

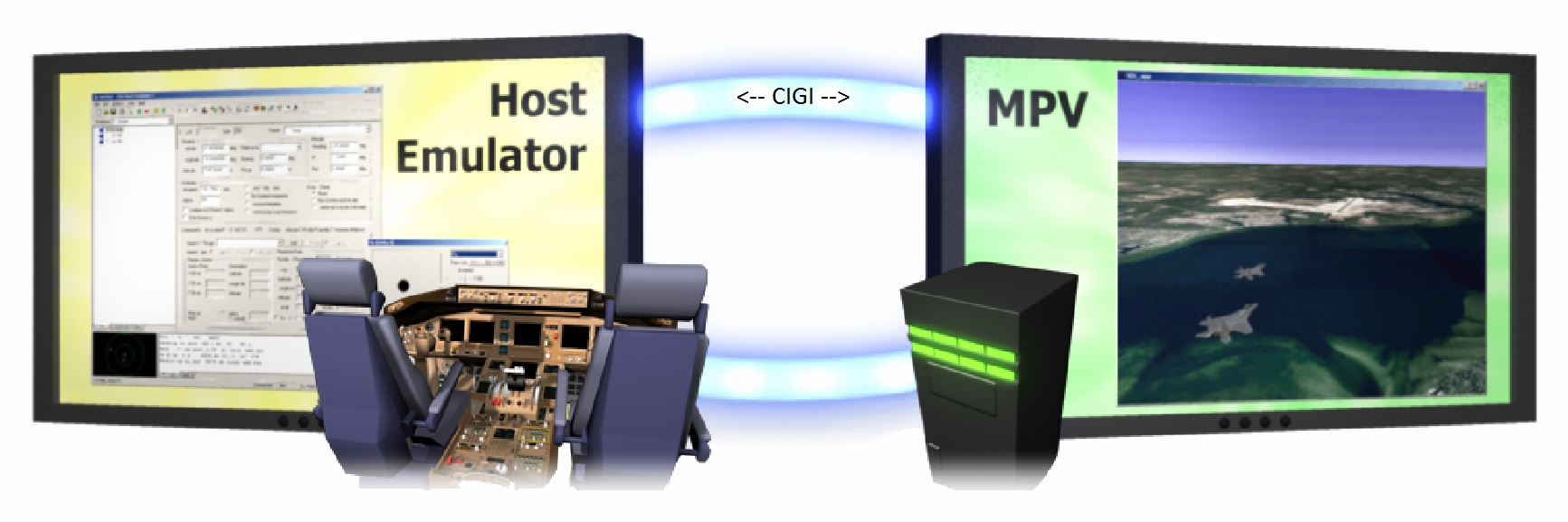
Sample communication between an Image Generator Host, and a Viewer.

== Background ==
Most high-end simulators do not have everything running on a single machine the way popular home software flight simulators are currently implemented. The airplane model is run on one machine, normally referred to as the host, and the out the window visuals or scene graph program is run on another, usually referred to as an Image Generator (IG). Frequently there are multiple IGs required to display the surrounding environment created by a host. CIGI is the interface between the 'host' and the IGs.

The main goal of CIGI is to capitalize on previous investments through the use of a common interface. CIGI is designed to assist suppliers and integrators of IG systems with ease of integration, code reuse, and overall cost reduction.

In the past most image generators provided their own proprietary interface; every host had to implement that interface making changing image generators a costly ordeal. CIGI was created to standardize the interface between the host and the image generator so that little modification would be needed to switch image generators. The CIGI initiative was largely spearheaded by The Boeing Company during the early 21st century.

The latest version of CIGI (CIGI 4.0) was developed by the Simulation Interoperability Standards Organization (SISO) in the form of SISO-STD-013-2014, Standard for Common Image Generator Interface (CIGI), Version 4.0, dated 22 August 2014. SISO-STD-013-2014 is freely available from SISO.

== Definitions ==
Image generator – In this context an image generator consists of one or more rendering channels that produce an image that can be used to visualize an “Out-The-Window” scene, or images produced by various sensor simulations such as Infra-red, Day TV, electro-optical, and night vision.

Host simulation – In this context a “Host” is the computational system that provides information about the device being simulated so that the image generator can portray the correct scenery to the user. This information is passed via CIGI to the image generator.

== Maturation ==
CIGI 4 is the latest version of the standard as was approved by the Simulation Interoperability Standards Organization on August 22, 2014. CIGI became an international SISO standard known as SISO-STD-013-2014; which contains the CIGI version 4.0 Interface Control Document (ICD).

CIGI 4.0 is the official standard, published by SISO. Previous versions of CIGI were spearheaded by Boeing include CIGI v3.3, in November 2008, v3.2 April 2006, v3.1 June 2004, v3 November 2003, v2 in March 2002, and the original (v1) in March 2001

== Protocol dependencies ==
Typically, CIGI uses UDP as its transport protocol, but CIGI does not require a specific transport mechanism, only packet definition conformance. CIGI traffic does not have a well known port; however, the use of ports 8004-8005 has been widely adopted by commercial image generator vendors implementations.

== Development tools ==
=== Host Emulator ===
The Host Emulator can be used as a surrogate to manipulate the interface when a simulation Host is not available. It is a Windows-based image generator Host application used to develop, integrate and test image generators that use the CIGI protocol. It provides a graphical user interface (GUI) for the creation, modification and deletion of entities; manipulation of views; control of environmental attributes and phenomena; and other host functions.

The Host Emulator has several features that are useful for integration and testing. A free-flight mode allows for fixed-wing and rotorcraft flight, movement along entity axes and free rotation using a joystick or a joystick-like widget. Scripting and record/playback features support regression testing, demonstrations and other tasks needing exact reproduction of certain sequences of events. A packet-level snoop feature allows the user to examine the contents of CIGI messages, image generator response times and latencies.

A Heartbeat Monitor Window shows a graphical timing history of the Image Generator's data frame rate. Other features include explicit packet creation, animation control, missile flyouts and a situation display window (Host Emulator 3.x only).

=== Multi-Purpose Viewer ===
The Multi-Purpose Viewer (MPV) provides the basic functionality expected of an Image Generator, such as loading and displaying a terrain database, displaying entities and so forth. The Multi-Purpose Viewer can be used as a surrogate to manipulate the interface when a real Image Generator is not available. The MPV is capable of operating with both the Windows and Linux operating systems.

=== CIGI Class Library ===
The CCL is an object-oriented software interface that automatically handles message composition and decomposition (i.e. packing, unpacking and byte swapping to the ICD specification) on both the Host and Image Generator sides of the interface. The CCL interprets Host or Image Generator messages based on compile time parameters. It also performs error handling and translation between different versions of CIGI.

Each packet type has its own class. The individual packet members are accessed through packet class accessors. Outgoing messages are constructed by placing each packet into the outgoing buffer using a streaming operator. Incoming messages are parsed using callback or event-based mechanisms that supply the using program with fully populated packet objects.

=== Current tool suite ===
A set of CIGI development tools are managed and maintained by the SISO CIGI Product Support Group. The latest packages are available on SourceForge.

Comments/Suggestions to the package can be directed to the SISO discussion board at: https://discussions.sisostds.org/index.htm?A0=SAC-PSG-CIGI

=== Wireshark ===
Wireshark is a free and open source packet analyzer. It is used for network troubleshooting, analysis, software and communications protocol development, and education. Wireshark provides a dissector for CIGI packets. As of October 2016, “The CIGI dissector is fully functional for CIGI version 2 and 3. Version 1 is not yet implemented.”

=== Older versions of CIGI ===
A CIGI Interface Control Document (ICD) and development suite is available in open source format. The tools, ICD, and accompanying user documentation can be found and downloaded from the CIGI sourceforge web site.

The SourceForge version of the MPV is limited in its support of CIGI data packets and is intended to grow as needs arise. The MPV uses CIGI 3 as its interface, but the MPV is backward-compatible with earlier CIGI versions through the use of the CCL. The MPV uses the Open Scene Graph library to render a scene. The scene graph is manipulated according to the CIGI commands received from the Host via the CCL. The MPV itself is an application layer that consists of a small kernel leveraging heavily on a plug-in architecture for ease of maintainability and flexibility.

An implementer can implement the interface from scratch, however a full suite of integration tools is available. These tools consist of three elements. The Host Emulator (HE), the Multi-Purpose Viewer (MPV), and the CIGI Class Library (CCL).
