= Panssarimiina m/44 =

Anti-tank mine

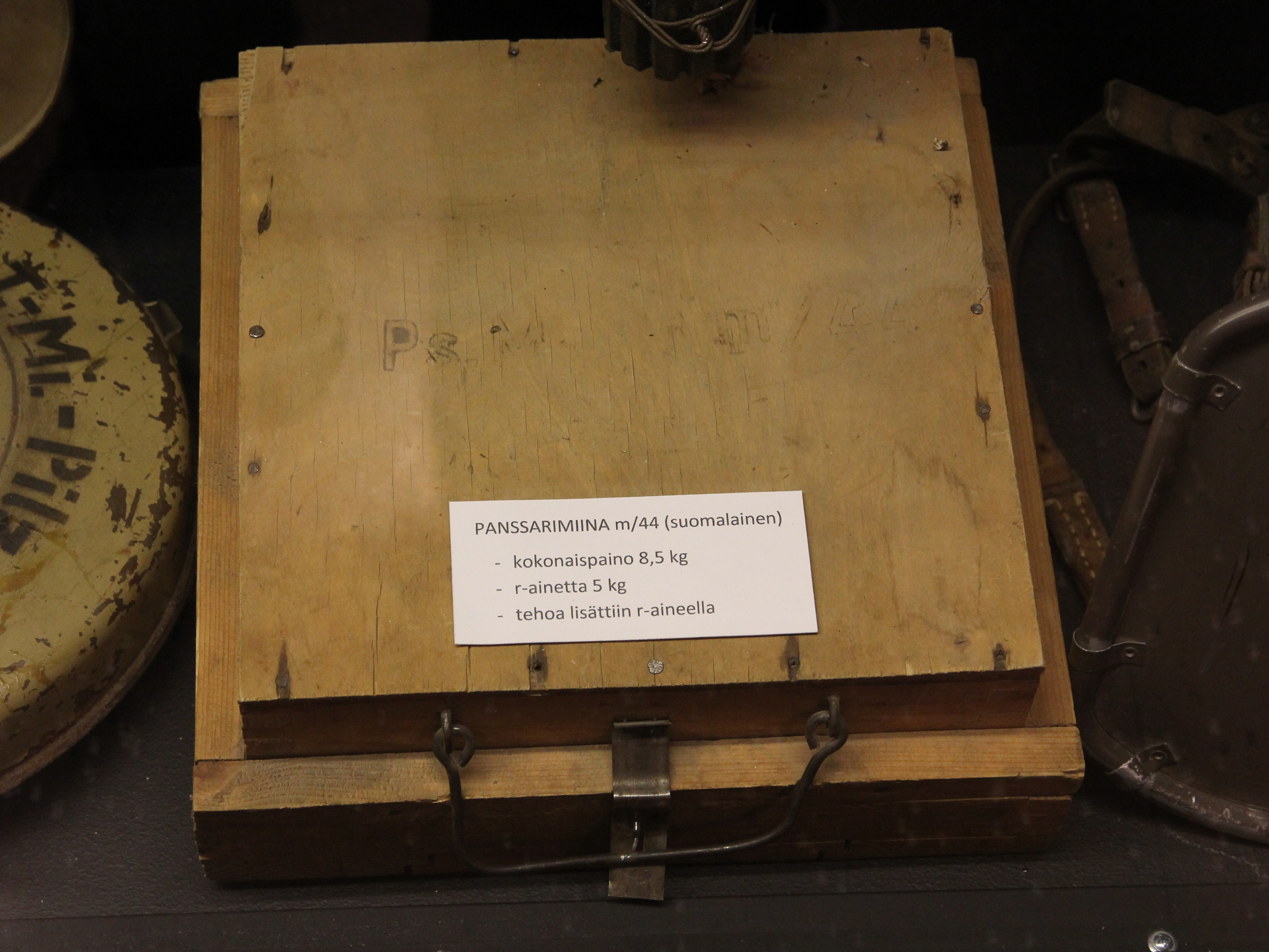
Panssarimiina m/44

The Panssarimiina m/44 is a Finnish anti-tank blast mine. It entered service in 1944 and was used during the Second World War and Continuation War. The mine used a wooden case, consisting of an upper box containing the main charge and a downward facing fuze, this was placed into a sturdy wooden tray, larger than the box. Enough pressure on the upper box resulted in the upper box collapsing into the lower tray and triggering the detonator.

== Specifications ==
- Height: 0.115 m
- Length: 0.31 m
- Weight: 8.5 kg
- Explosive content: 5 kg of TNT
- Operating pressure: 350 kg
