= List of military equipment used by the mujahideen during the Soviet–Afghan War =

This list shows military equipment used by the mujahideen during the Soviet–Afghan War. The Mujahideen obtained weapons from many sources, mostly supplied by foreign sources, such as the Central Intelligence Agency’s Operation Cyclone, China, Egypt, Iran, Israel and the United Kingdom, and channeled through Pakistan. Many weapons were also captured from the Soviet Army or the Armed Forces of the Democratic Republic of Afghanistan.

== Small arms ==
Weapon	Image	Type	Origin	Notes
TT-33		Semi-automatic pistol	Soviet Union	Captured from Soviet and DRA troops. Khyber Pass copies were also used.
Makarov PM		Semi-automatic pistol	Soviet Union	Captured from the Soviet Army and DRA Army. Khyber Pass copies were also used.
Stechkin APS		Machine pistol	Soviet Union	Captured from Soviet forces.
Carl Gustav		Submachine gun	Sweden	
PPSh-41		Submachine gun	Soviet Union	
Sten		Submachine gun	British Empire	
Norinco CQ		Assault rifle	People's Republic of China	
L1A1 Self-Loading Rifle		Battle rifle	India	Indian variants acquired by Pakistan; almost all were not used eventually due to concerns of ammo supplies.
AKM		Assault rifle	Soviet Union	Captured from Afghan Army.
Type 56		Assault rifle	People's Republic of China	
AK-74		Assault rifle	Soviet Union	Captured from the Soviet Army and Afghan Army.
AKS-74U		Assault rifle	Soviet Union	Known as the "Krinkov" by the Mujahideen
M16		Assault rifle	United States	
Heckler & Koch G3		Battle rifle	West Germany	License built version obtained from Iran
Jezail		Musket	Emirate of Afghanistan	Limited use.
Martini–Henry		Single-shot rifle	British Empire	Limited use.
Mosin–Nagant		Bolt-action rifle	Soviet Union	Delivered to Afghanistan in 1919 on Lenin's orders.
Lebel		Bolt-action rifle	French Third Republic	
Lee–Enfield		Bolt-action rifle	British Empire	
M1917 Springfield		Bolt-action rifle	United States of America	Called G3 by the Mujahideen
Hanyang 88		Bolt-action rifle	People's Republic of China	
SKS		Semi-automatic rifle	Soviet Union	
M1 Garand		Semi-automatic rifle	United States	
RPD		Light machine gun	Soviet Union	Most commonly used machine gun.
RPK		Light machine gun	Soviet Union	Most commonly used machine gun.
ZB vz. 26		Light machine gun	Czechoslovakia	Limited use.
PKM		General-purpose machine gun	Soviet Union	Limited use.
Type 67		General-purpose machine gun	China	

== Heavy weapons ==
This includes anti-air and anti-tank weapons used by the Mujahideen, also artillery.

Weapon	Image	Type	Origin	Notes
DShK		Heavy machine gun	Soviet Union	
Type 54 HMG		Heavy machine gun	China	
SG-43 Goryunov		Medium machine gun	Soviet Union	
KVP		Heavy machine gun	Soviet Union	
ZU-23-2		Anti-aircraft gun	Soviet Union	Some mounted on trucks and armored vehicles.
ZPU		Anti-aircraft gun	Soviet Union	ZPU-1 and ZPU-2 versions used.
Oerlikon 20mm cannon		Anti-aircraft gun	Switzerland	40 delivered in 1984.
RPG-2		Rocket-propelled grenade	Soviet Union	
RPG-7		Rocket-propelled grenade	Soviet Union	
RPG-22		Disposable rocket launcher	Soviet Union	Captured from Soviet forces
LAW		Disposable rocket launcher	USA	
Type 69 RPG		Rocket-propelled grenade	China	
Type 56		75 mm recoilless rifle	China	
B-10 recoilless rifle		82 mm recoilless rifle	Soviet Union	Supplied by China.
Two-inch mortar		51 mm mortar	United Kingdom	Reportedly supplied by the Gulf states.
Type 63		60 mm mortar	China	
82-BM-37		82 mm mortar	Soviet Union	Most widely used artillery piece
M1942 (ZiS-3)		76 mm field gun	Soviet Union	Captured from DRA forces
2A18 (D-30)		122 mm howitzer	Soviet Union	Captured from DRA forces
M1938 (M-30)		122 mm howitzer	Soviet Union	Captured from DRA forces
Type 63		107 mm multiple rocket launcher	China	About 500 launchers supplied.
Saqar		Multiple rocket launcher	Egypt	Egyptian variant of BM-21 Grad. Delivered in several variants with varying range and caliber.
9K32 Strela-2 (SA-7 Grail)		Man-portable air-defense system	Soviet Union	Captured from DRA forces. Egyptian Sakr-eye version also used.
9K34 Strela-3 (SA-14 Gremlin)		Man-portable air-defense system	Soviet Union	
FIM-43 Redeye		Man-portable air-defense system	United States	50 launchers delivered.
FIM-92 Stinger		Man-portable air-defense system	United States	800 missiles delivered overall, deliveries began in 1986.
HN-5		Man-portable air-defense system	China	HN-5A and HN-5B versions delivered, about 400 missiles supplied.
Blowpipe		Man-portable air-defense system	United Kingdom	50 launchers and 300 missiles delivered.
BGM-71 TOW		Anti-tank guided missile	United States	80 launchers delivered in 1988
MILAN		Anti-tank guided missile	France	160 launchers delivered in 1988
PMN mine		Anti-personnel mine	Soviet Union	
M18 Claymore mine		Anti-personnel mine	United States	
A.P. Mine No.5		Anti-personnel mine	United Kingdom	
TS-50 mine		Anti-personnel mine	Italy	
TM-46 mine		Anti-tank mine	Soviet Union	
M19 mine		Anti-tank mine	United States	
A.T. Mine G.S. Mark V		Anti-tank mine	United Kingdom	
Mk 7 mine		Anti-tank mine	United Kingdom	
TC-2.5 mine		Anti-tank mine	Italy	
TC-6.1 mine		Anti-tank mine	Italy	
PRB M3 mine		Anti-tank mine	Belgium	

== Vehicles ==
The Mujahideen acquired substantial amounts of armoured vehicles from the DRA, both captured during combat and brought over by defectors but the lack of trained personnel, spare parts and the prevalence of Soviet airpower meant that they were seldom used.

Weapon	Image	Type	Origin	Notes
T-55		Main battle tank	Soviet Union	Captured from the DRA, limited use
BMP-1		Infantry fighting vehicle	Soviet Union	Captured from the DRA, limited use
BTR-60		Armoured personnel carrier	Soviet Union	Captured from the DRA, limited use
BTR-152		Armoured personnel carrier	Soviet Union	Captured from the DRA, limited use
M113		Armoured personnel carrier	United States	~5 given by United States
GAZ-66		Transport truck	Soviet Union	Captured from the DRA
ZIL-130		Transport truck	Soviet Union	
Toyota Land Cruiser		Pickup truck	Japan	Bought in Pakistan
KrAZ-255		Transport truck	Soviet Union	

== Gallery ==
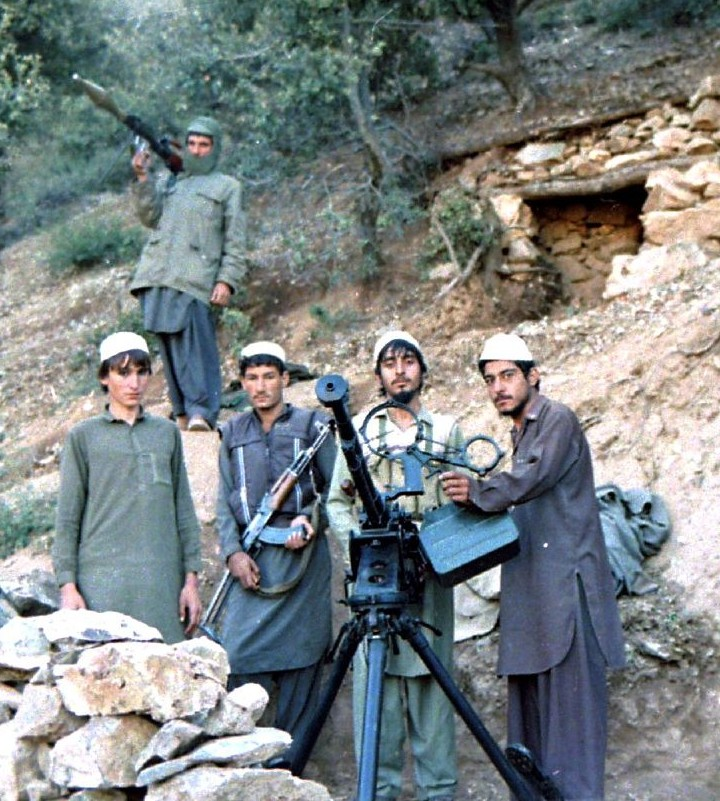
Jamiat-e-Islami Mujahideen manning a DShK.

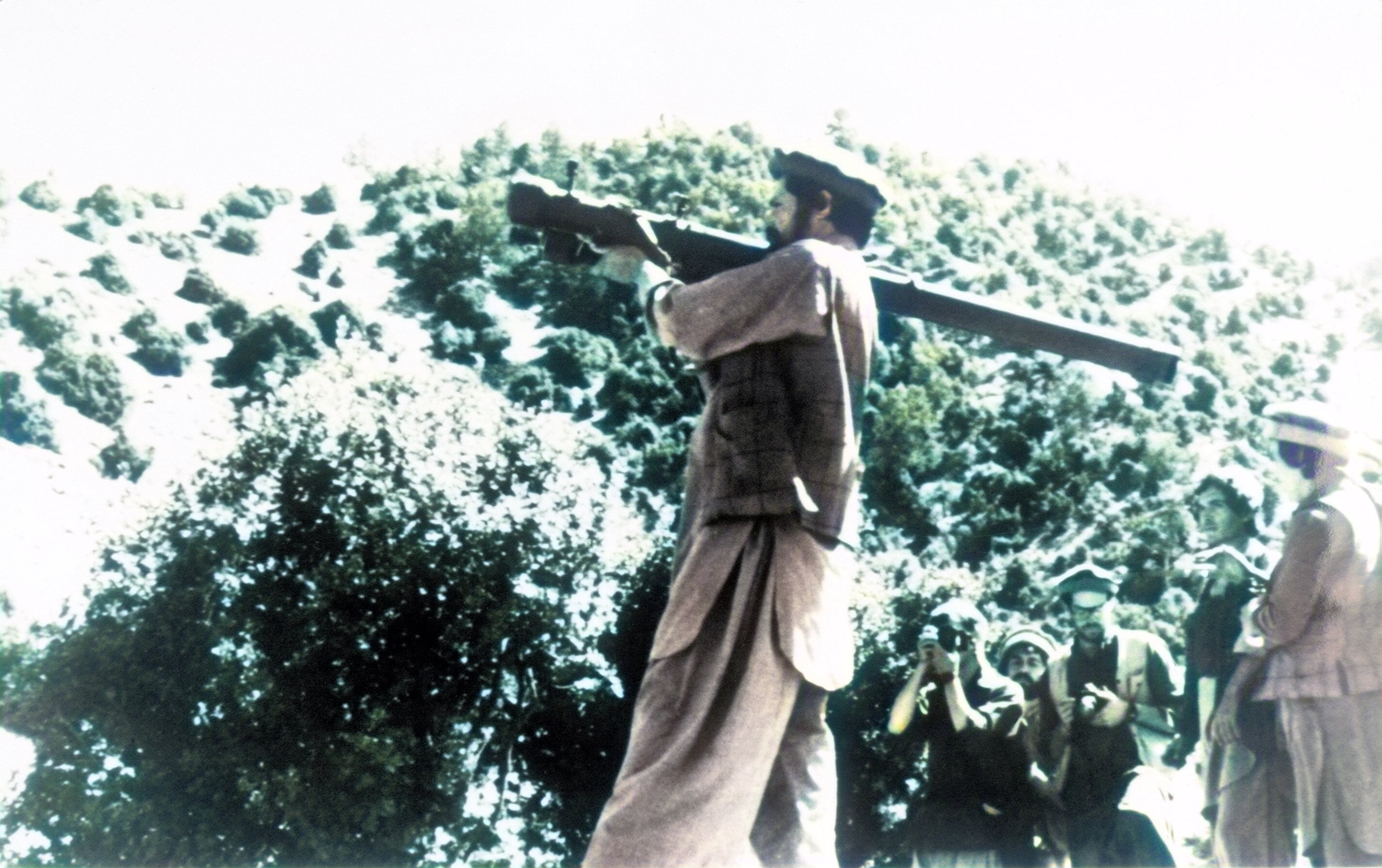
9K32 Strela-2 missile.

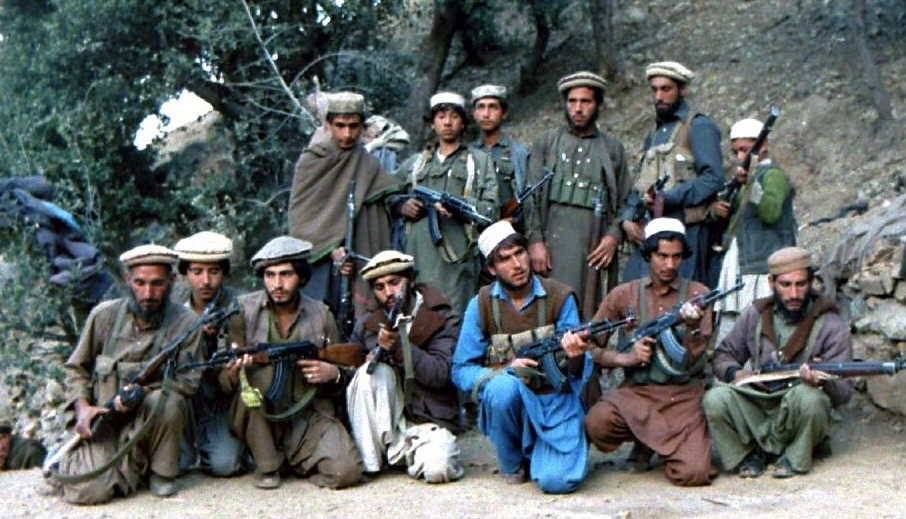
Hezb-i Islami Khalis fighters with a mix of AK-47 and Lee–Enfield rifles

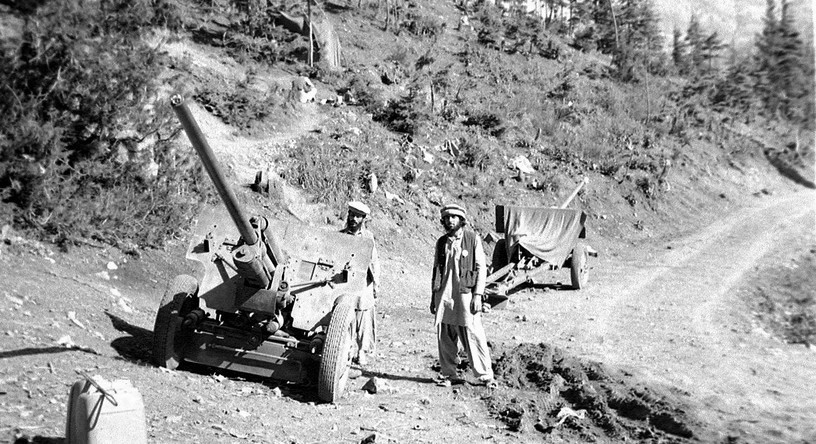
Captured field guns

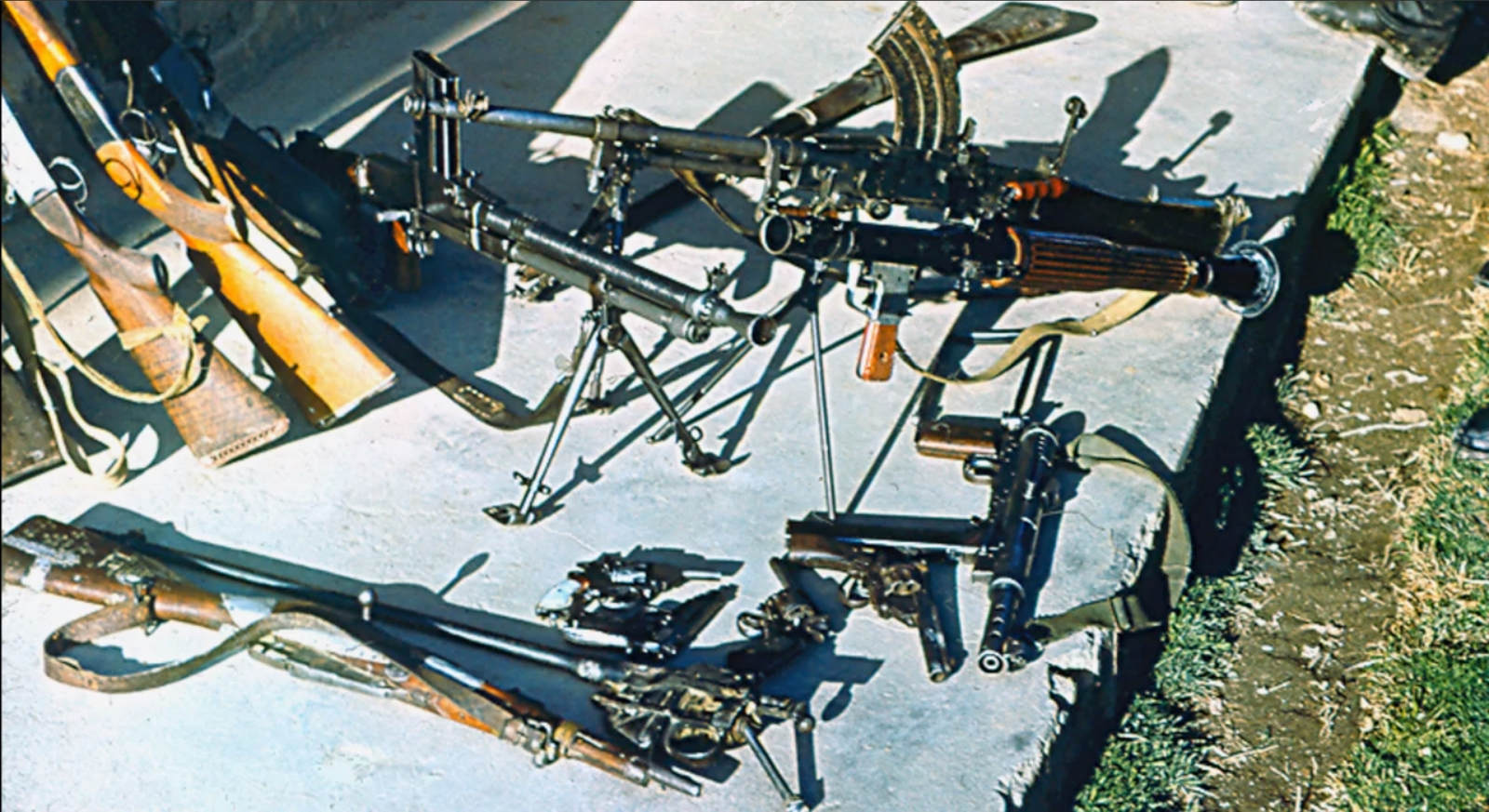
Mujahideen weaponry seized by the Soviets: rocket-propelled grenades, light machine guns, submachine guns, shotguns
