= EPLS and DROPS =

British logistics vehicle family

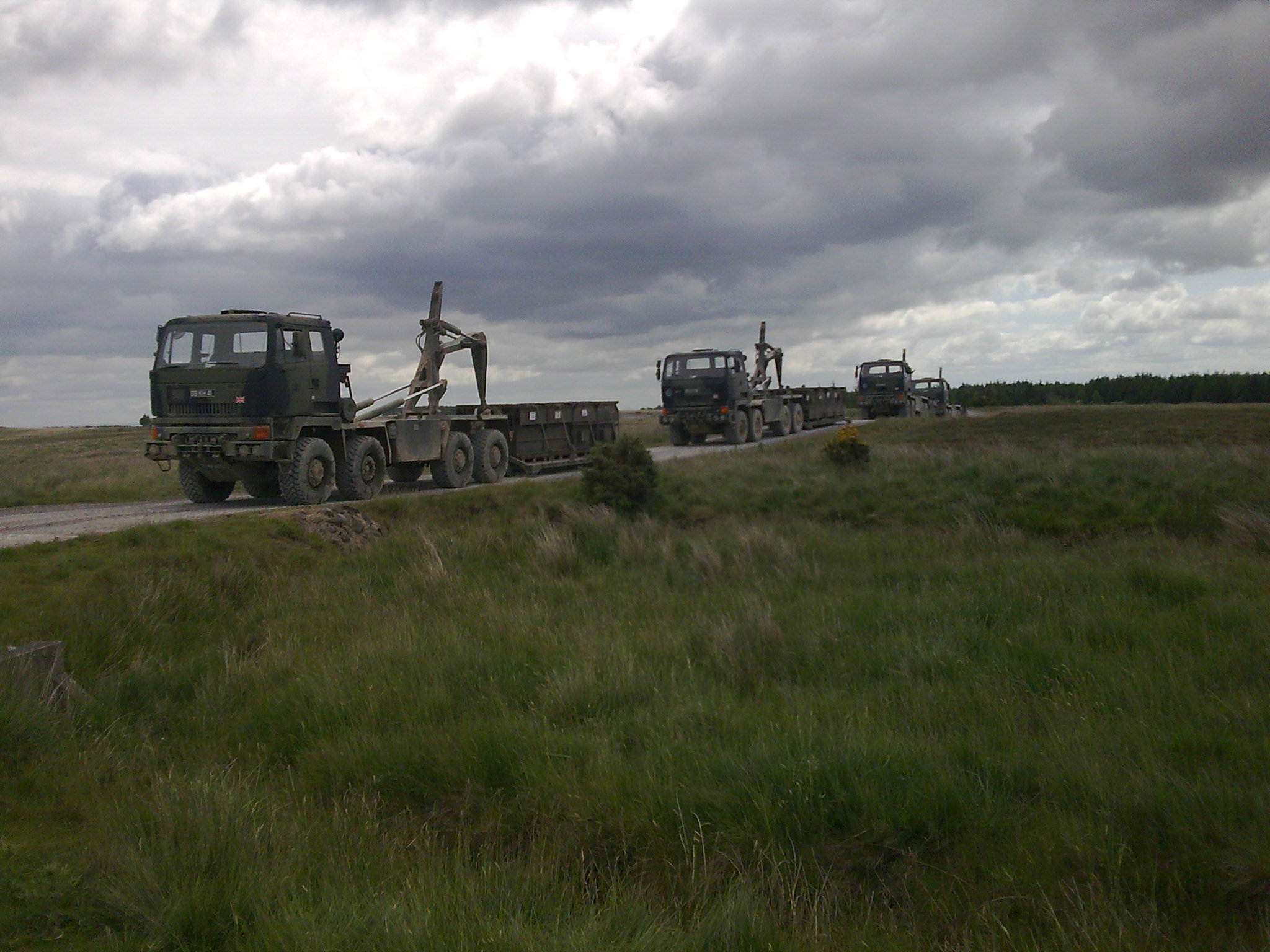
MMLC near Catterick, 2009

The Demountable Rack Offload and Pickup System (DROPS) was a family of logistics vehicles formerly operated by the British Army, which consisted of two vehicle types:

- Leyland DAF medium mobility load carrier (MMLC)
- Foden improved medium mobility load carrier (IMMLC)

Both were able to transport 15-tonne flatracks or containers configured to ISO 20 feet standard and to load and offload them autonomously. Both may have been supported with side rail transfer equipment (SRTE) for loading and unloading railway wagons.

The DROP system was designed to meet the very high intensity battles in Central Europe in the last decade of the Cold War. However, it entered service after the collapse of the Warsaw Pact, but nevertheless proved a versatile vehicle system on operations completely different from those originally envisaged.

As the DROPS vehicles aged, a replacement was introduced based on the 15 tonne MAN SV, designated the Enhanced Pallet Load System (EPLS).

== Operational requirement ==
The DROP system developed from the revaluation of readiness and firepower requirements of British Army of the Rhine (BAOR) in the mid-1970s. This was driven by three principal developments in the Warsaw Pact and, in particular, Group Soviet Forces in Germany (GSFG). These were:

- The capability for rapid mobilisation and deployment brought about by increased mechanisation and enhanced communications in the Soviet Army.

This was linked to a doctrine of much more rapid and decisive attack designed to dislocate NATO defences by highly concentrated and massive penetration.

- The development of improved tank designs such as the T-72 (and later the T-80) that were to all intents and purposes impervious to 105mm artillery fire but could be affected by 155mm calibre.

To counter these developments a decision was made to make all divisional artillery 155mm and phase out the 105mm Abbot. The Corps Barrier Plan, a major structure of obstacles, including a huge minefield made up of anti-tank bar mines and Ranger anti-personnel mines was also strengthened to blunt such tactics. Finally two parallel studies: the Battle Attrition Study (BAS) and Review of Ammunition Rates and Scales (RARS) worked through the implications to the British Army of the predicted new style of Soviet aggression.

The BAS confirmed that 1 (BR) Corps could resist and contain a Soviet attack of the type predicted but that over eight days of high-intensity warfare would suffer massive casualties. However it was imperative for a follow-on capability to exist and there should be sufficient manpower, materiel and ammunition for 1 (BR) Corps to fight on at 40% of mobilisation strength for a further two days. This became known as the 8+2 model.

The RARS identified that the previous ammunition scales for the NATO 30-day battle would be completely used up in the 8+2 scenario. Furthermore, the change from 105mm (with a shell weighing 18 lbs) to 155mm (with a shell weighing 96 lbs) plus the huge quantities of bar mines created additional storage requirements with an emphasis on locating stocks forward to meet shorter warning scenarios.

It became clear on trials in the late 1970s and early 1980s that the existing transport fleet operated by the Royal Corps of Transport (RCT) and forward principally by the Royal Artillery (RA) and the Royal Engineers (RE) was inadequate. Fix-bodied trucks loaded and unloaded by fork-lift trucks could not move fast enough. Depots were too cramped to outload at the pace required and stocks on the ground could not be moved sufficiently quickly to meet the predicted pace of battle. Productivity fell: instead of the two-to-three round trips a day envisaged often only one could be achieved with the remainder of the time spent queueing. Finally, the rail outloading system from the ammunition depots along the Rhine could not meet the challenge and railheads capable of providing sufficient space to offload trains using conventional materiel handling equipment were limited and vulnerable.

A work study showed that a truck of large capacity, ideally built to ISO container 20 foot standard, that could load and offload its own body cut through all the delays and significantly improved mobility. In parallel materiel handling equipment (MHE) of special design could speed up rail loading and offloading by a considerable margin and work on a wider variety of sites in comparison with conventional materiel handling equipment such as the Eager Beaver forklift.

This novel concept was agreed within the Ministry of Defence (MOD) in 1981 and let to two staff targets (GST 3920 for the vehicle and GST 3921 for the MHE) being passed to industry in August 1982. Procurement was novel in that tenders were requested for the whole system. It had also become apparent in early 1982 that RA and RE vehicles operating forward would require higher levels of mobility and the DROPS (improved medium mobility load carrier -IMMLC) was specified.

== Specification and procurement ==
Leyland and Foden vehicles were fitted with MULTILIFT loading equipment that were selected from designs submitted to the Ministry of Defence by a wide cross-section of the UK engineering industry. It was by far the most detailed selection process ever undertaken for a British Army logistic system.

The provisionally selected vehicles were extensively trialled for a year by a specially-formed trials unit, before both the unit and the MOD were completely satisfied that they met the army's requirements. The DROPS vehicles and equipment were limited in their design to operate effectively only in NATO's European climatic conditions of temperature and humidity, and as such both variants were only available in left hand drive only. It has, therefore, been a challenging engineering problem to ensure that they have performed extremely well under war conditions in an environment for which they were specifically not designed - the desert.

== MMLC ==
Introduced in early 1990, the truck was a military development of the commercial Leyland T45 Roadtrain. As the company had entrusted to Scammell the development of the commercial eight-wheeled variant (S24 constructor range), the military variant was developed as the Scammell S26. Initially developed for the 1986 DROPS trials as a 6x6, the final 8x6 S26 had a Rolls-Royce Perkins 350 Eagle engine; a 12-litre diesel @ 350 horsepower (260 kW)), a ZF six-speed automatic gearbox and Kirkstall axles.

In February 1987 the company learned that its tender for 1,522 such vehicles was successful, but because the Leyland group merged with DAF Trucks of the Netherlands to form DAF NV the S26 would be built at the Leyland factory in Leyland, Lancashire, allowing the complete closure of Scammell's Watford site. Leyland eventually produced 1,421 MMLC vehicles and a number of vehicle cabs ordered as spares. Due to damage, the entire MoD stock of spare cabs has now been exhausted.

During the first Gulf War, the vehicles suffered from sand ingress, which resulted in a total failure of the engine plant. A modification was quickly introduced to raise the air intake to avoid the sand ingress. During 2002 the fleet underwent a major midlife upgrade and refurbishment. This included the introduction of an anti-lock braking system (ABS). The MMLC had two trailer types, (known as "king" and "queen" trailers) specifically designed to carry the same load pallet which was transferred from the main vehicle. The queen trailer was supplied by Reynolds Boughton but the king trailer was indeed supplied by King Trailers who have since 1962 been the UK's biggest manufacturer of trailers for specialist loads. The Leyland DAF MMLC vehicles were mainly issued to the Royal Corps of Transport (RCT), later to become Royal Logistic Corps (RLC), however a number of these vehicles were provided to other units along with the RAF Regiment.

== IMMLC ==
Production of the Foden IMMLCs began in January 1994. 404 were introduced. These vehicles were primarily supplied to the Royal Artillery in support of the AS90. These vehicles differed significantly from the Leyland DAF variants, notably with Foden cabs, but with increased ground clearance, and Perkins (Shrewsbury) Eagle 350 MX diesel engines. The IMMLC vehicles again had a specifically designed trailer, for the transportation of replacement engines for the AS90.

== EPLS ==
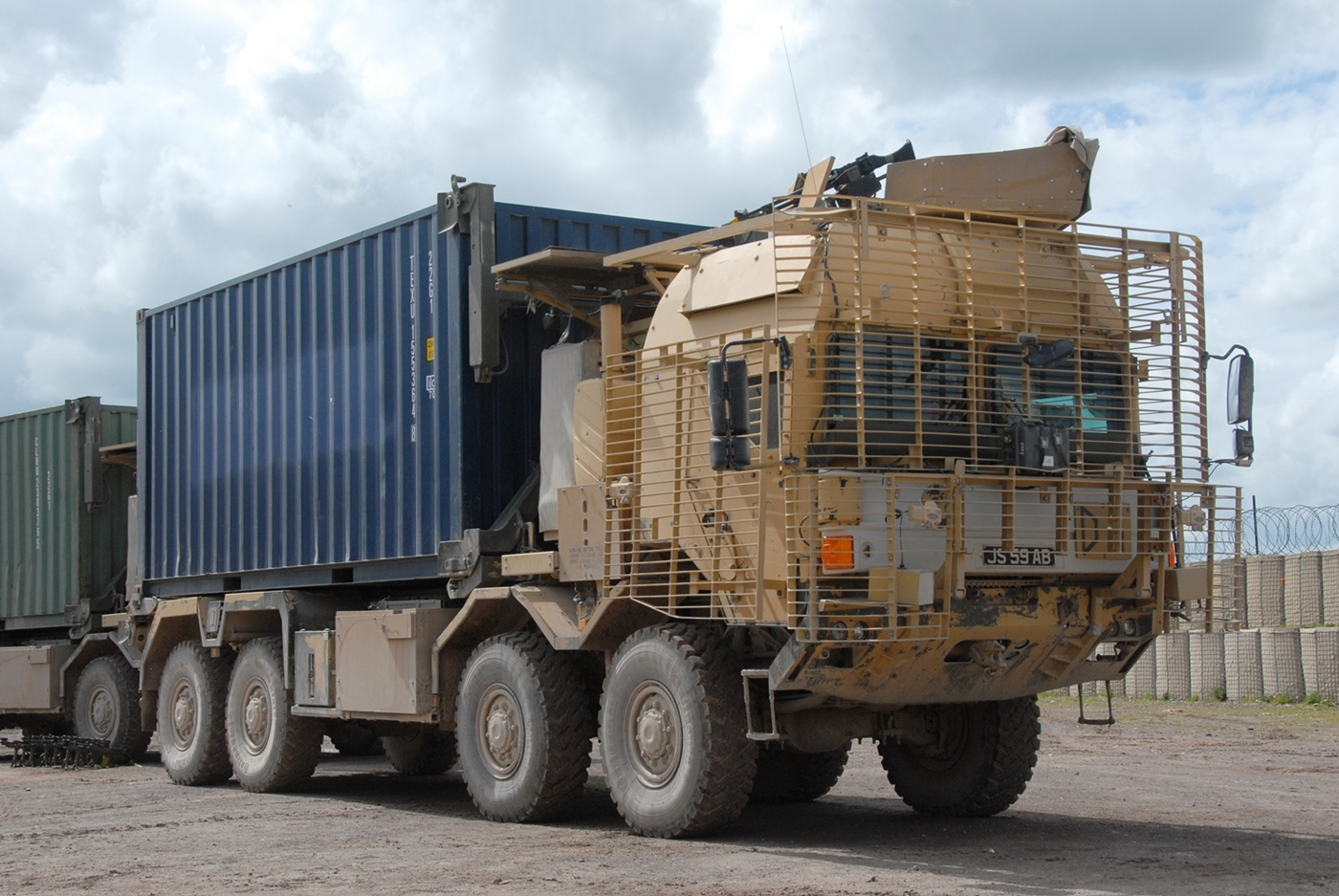
EPLS with uprated protection

As both DROPS vehicles are now out of commercial production, resulting in vastly reduced and resultantly higher cost spares provision, and taking into account the wider geographic nature of modern British Army deployment, the MOD have retired and replaced them with the Enhanced Pallet Load System|Enhanced Pallet Load System (EPLS), which is based on the 15 tonne MAN SV, a family of vehicles already in widespread Army use. The EPLS allows for the loading of ISO containers without having to place then on a flat-rack first.

== See also ==
- Palletized Load System
