= Barmin =

Barmin (Russian: Бармин), also transcribed Barmine, is a Russian surname. Notable persons with that surname:

- Vladimir Pavlovich Barmin (1909–1993), a Soviet scientist, designer of the rocket launch complexes.
- Alexander Gregory Barmine (1899–1987), a Soviet officer, diplomat, and self-confessed spy, who defected to the West in 1937 and became an official at Voice of America and USIA

== See also ==
- L9 Bar Mine
