= A.T. Mine G.S. Mark V =

Anti Tank Mine. G.S. Mark V
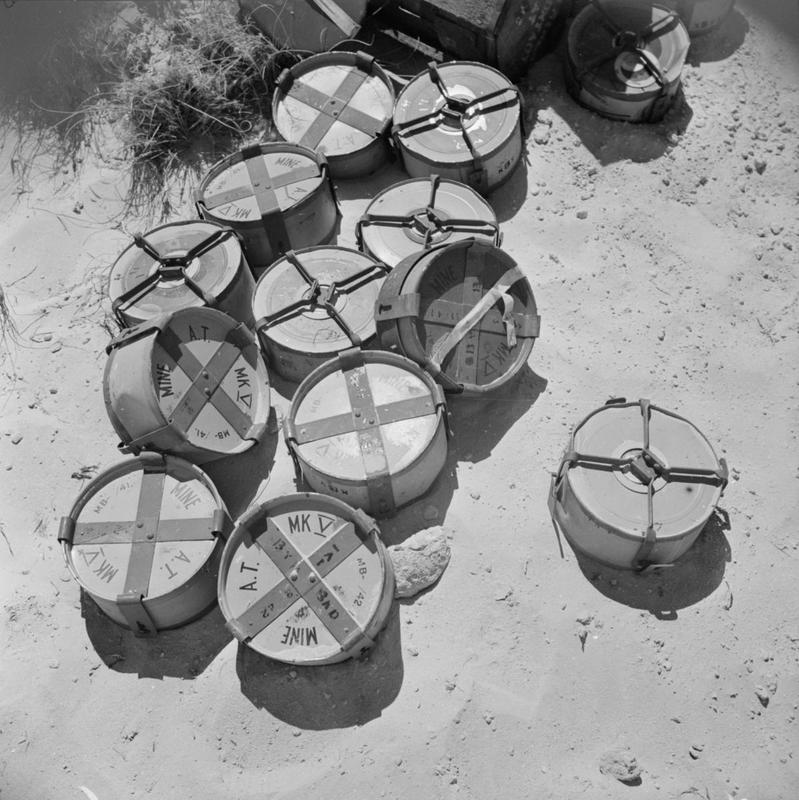
- Mark V GS Mines, about to be laid in Egypt, 2 July 1942
- Type: anti-tank mine
- Place of origin: United Kingdom

Service history
- Wars: World War II; Rhodesian Bush War; South African Border War

Production history
- Variants: Mine G.S. Mk V; Mine G.S. Mk VC

Specifications
- Mass: 12.5 pounds (5.7 kg), Mk. V; 8 pounds (3.6 kg), Mk. VC
- Height: 4 inches (100 mm)
- Diameter: 8 inches (200 mm)
- Filling: TNT or Baratol
- Filling weight: 8.25 pounds (3.74 kg), Mk. V; 4 pounds (1.8 kg), Mk. VC
- Detonation mechanism: Pressure activated, shear-pin fuze (350 pounds (160 kg) of pressure)

The Anti-Tank Mine, General Service, Mk V was a cylindrical, metal-cased United Kingdom anti-tank blast mine that entered service in 1943, during the Second World War. It was replaced in British service with the Mk 7 mine. Two versions of the mine were produced, the Mk. V and the Mk. VC with the same external dimensions. The only difference was that the Mk. VC had a half-sized explosive charge.

The mine used a spider pressure plate that makes it resistant to blast overpressure. The spider rests on a central Mk 3 fuse (sometimes referred to as No.3 Mk I), which contains a spring-loaded striker held in place by a shear pin. The mine, being made largely of steel tended to rust making its activation unpredictable.

The mine was obsolete in British service by 1962.

It is found in Angola, Egypt, Jordan, Libya, Mozambique, Sudan, and Zimbabwe.

== Variants ==
- Mine G.S. Mk VC (general service version)
- Mine G.S. Mk V
