= Mk 7 mine =

Anti-tank mine Mark 7
- Type: Anti-tank blast mine
- Place of origin: United Kingdom

Service history
- In service: –2003

Production history
- Manufacturer: Royal Ordnance
- Variants: Mk 7/4 (standard), Mk 7/7 (waterproof)

Specifications
- Mass: 13.6 kilograms (30 lb)
- Height: 139 millimetres (5.5 in)
- Diameter: 325 millimetres (12.8 in)
- Filling: TNT
- Filling weight: 8.89 kilograms (19.6 lb)
- Detonation mechanism: Double-impulse fuze, tilt-rod fuze (L93A1), anti-handling device

The Mk 7 mine was a circular British anti-tank blast mine. It replaced the World War 2-era Mk 5 mine, and has in turn been replaced by the L9 bar mine.

The Mk 7 can be laid either by hand or from a mechanical mine layer. The mine is conventional in design. It has a steel casing with a central, main fuze well, below which is a tetryl booster charge, both surrounded by the main explosive filling of TNT. The mine can be fitted with a variety of fuzes, including a double-impulse fuze (which gives it some resistance to explosive demining methods) or the L93A1 tilt-rod fuze, which gives it a full-width attack capability.

The mine has a secondary fuze well for an anti-lifting device and a mechanical anti-handling device was also produced for the mine, although this is reported to have never been used. The mine is currently being phased out of service with the British army. The mine is found in Afghanistan, Angola, Cyprus, Egypt, Eritrea, Ethiopia, Lebanon, Libya, Namibia, Oman, Somalia, and Zambia.

The two most modern variants of the mine, the Mk 7/4 (standard) and the Mk 7/7 (waterproof), were taken out of service by the UK by March 2003, after which disposal of existing stockpiles commenced.

A Soviet-era mine was responsible for the deaths of 10 Afghan girls, aged between nine and thirteen years, in December 2012. Two Mk7 mines were found nearby and presumed to be of the same type as the mine that exploded.

== Specifications ==
- Diameter: 325 millimetres (12.8 in)
- Height: 130 millimetres (5.1 in)
- Weight: 13.6 kilograms (30 lb)
- Explosive content: 8.89 kilograms (19.6 lb) kg of TNT
- Operating pressure: 150 to 275 kilograms (331 to 606 lb)

== Variants ==
- Mk 7/4 (standard)
- Mk 7/7 (waterproof)
