= L10 Ranger anti-personnel mine =

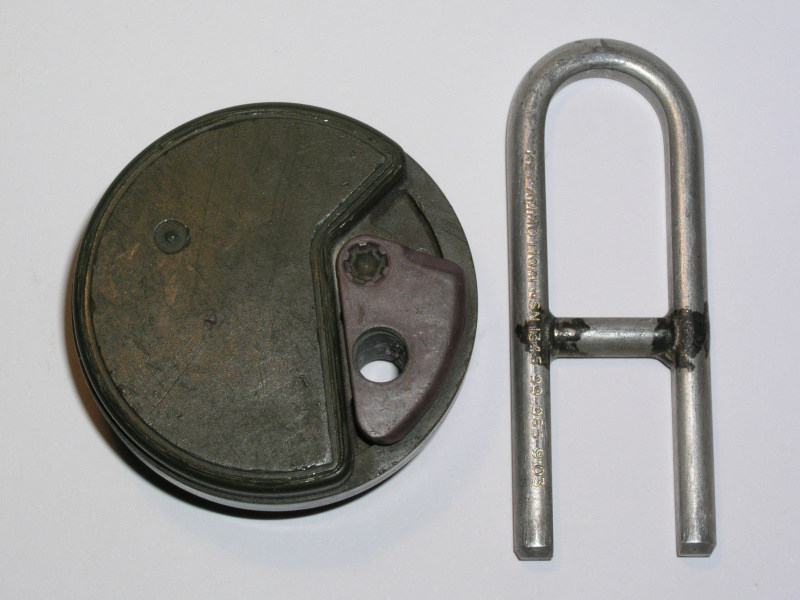
- L10 Ranger anti-personnel mine & arming key
- Type: Anti-personnel mine
- Place of origin: United Kingdom

Service history
- Used by: United Kingdom

Specifications
- Mass: 136 grams (4.8 oz)
- Height: 30 millimetres (1.2 in)
- Diameter: 60 millimetres (2.4 in)
- Filling: phlegmatized RDX
- Filling weight: 109 grams (3.8 oz)

The L10 Ranger anti-personnel mine was a United Kingdom anti-personnel blast mine. It was used from the 1970s until stocks were destroyed in accordance with the Ottawa Treaty.

It was designed to be used in conjunction with the L9 bar mine anti-tank mine, to make anti-tank minefields more difficult for enemy sappers to clear by hand. An FV432 would be fitted with a plough through which bar mines would be laid. A firing frame which held 18 clips of 4 barrels each would be fitted to the top of the vehicle. Each barrel contained 18 Ranger mines, for a total of 1,296 mines. The frame could fire in any direction (although mines were not usually fired over the front of the vehicle). As each section of the anti-tank minefield was completed, several of the barrels would be fired. A small propelling charge would launch the mines, scattering them 50 to 250 metres (160 to 820 ft) behind or to the side of the mine-laying vehicle. The act of launching the mine from the tube would release a spring-loaded safety catch and start a timer which would arm the mine after 30 seconds.

The mine was roughly the size of a tin of shoe polish, made of plastic and coloured olive green. There was enough metal in their fuze to make them detectable. Two inert training versions were available. One was bright orange to allow it to be easily spotted and recovered; the other was made from bio-degradable compressed peat.

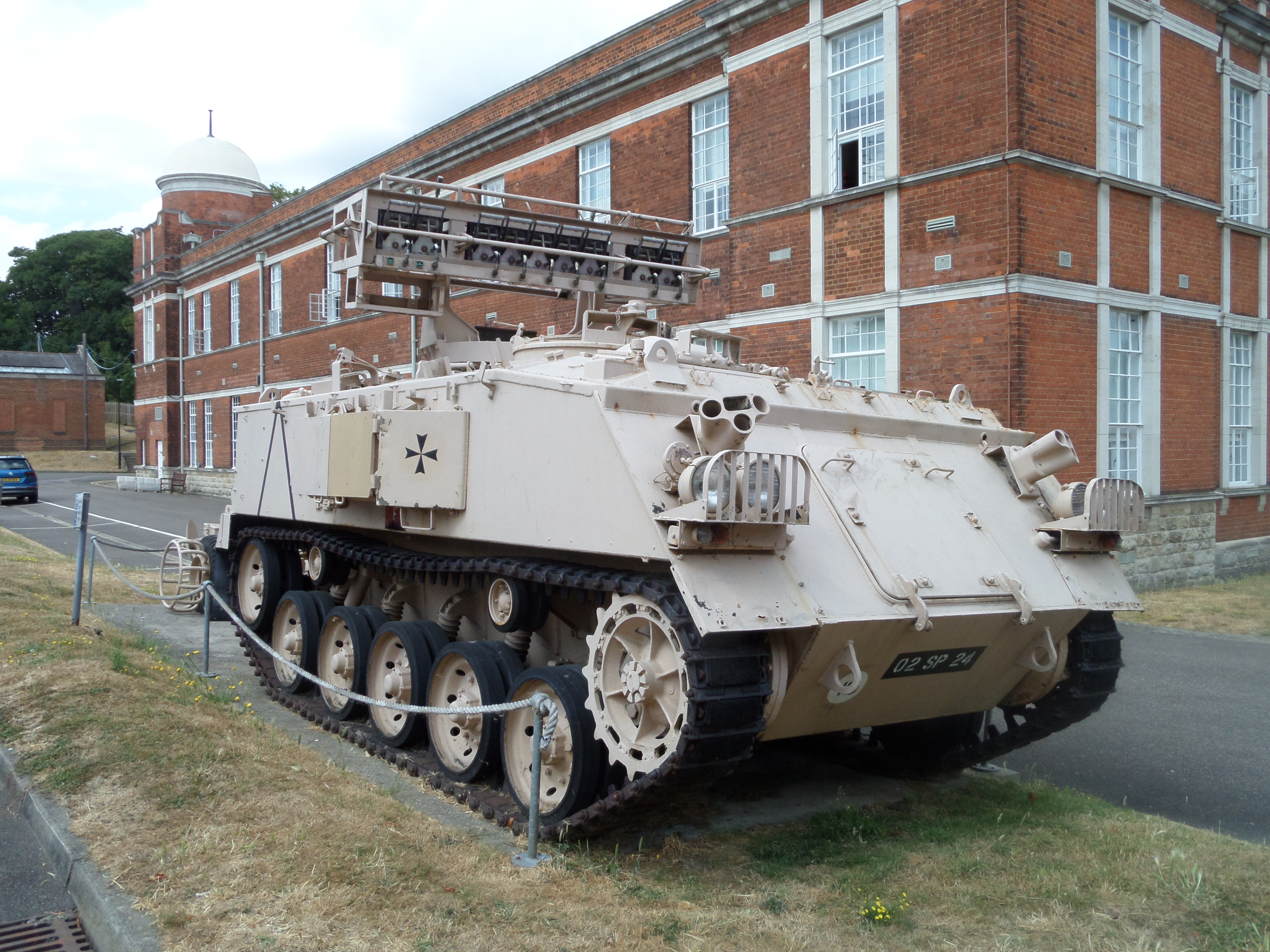
FV432, with bar mine plough and Ranger scattering frame

The Ranger mine laying system could also be fitted to a four-tonne truck, Stalwart high mobility load carrier or the combat support boat

The mines were supplied by Thorn EMI and most (Note: Possibly all) were supplied before 1986. In June 1998, stocks of 1,110,000 mines were held.

In accordance with treaties banning the use of anti-personnel mines, the UK has destroyed all its stocks of L10s as of March 1999.
