= L9 bar mine =

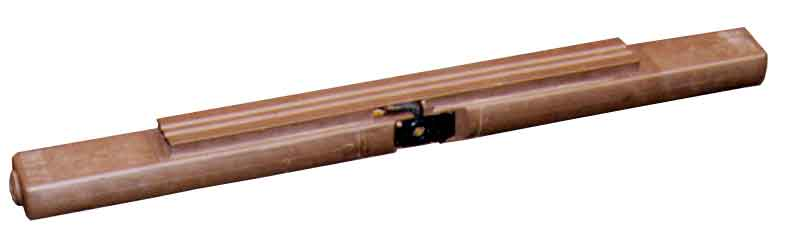
- L9 bar mine
- Type: Anti-tank blast mine
- Place of origin: United Kingdom

Service history
- In service: 1969–present

Specifications
- Mass: 11 kilograms (24 lb)
- Length: 120 centimetres (47 in)
- Width: 10.8 centimetres (4.3 in)
- Height: 8.2 centimetres (3.2 in)
- Filling: TNT
- Filling weight: 8.4 kilograms (19 lb)

The L9 bar mine is a large rectangular British anti-tank landmine. The bar mine's principal advantage is its long length, and therefore its trigger length. A typical anti-tank landmine is circular, and a vehicle's wheels or tracks, which make up only a small proportion of its total width, must actually press on the mine to activate it. To increase the probability of a vehicle striking the mine, the mine's effective trigger width must be increased.

The bar mine's shape allows a 50% reduction in the number of mines in a minefield without reducing its effectiveness. It was reported that it would take 90 sappers 150 minutes to lay a 1,000 yd (910 m) mine field consisting of 1,250 British Mark 7 anti-tank mines, weighing a total of 17 tonnes. By comparison, it would take 30 sappers 60 minutes to lay a 1,000 yard minefield consisting of 655 bar mines weighing a total of 7.2 tonnes.

The long mines can also be laid through a simple plough attached to the rear of an FV432 armoured personnel carrier. Laying circular mines in similar fashion requires a far larger plough and more powerful towing vehicle. The bar mine laying FV432s were also usually fitted with launchers for L10 Ranger anti-personnel mines, to make subsequent clearing of the minefield by hand by enemy sappers more difficult; however, the L10 was withdrawn from service by March 1999, in line with several conventions regulating mines which have been agreed to by the United Kingdom.

The bar mine is made of plastic, and cannot be detected by metal detectors. A metal plate is attached to bar mines which are intended to be subsequently recovered by friendly forces, usually for training purposes. A full width attack mine (FWAM) fuze and an anti-disturbance fuze are available for the bar mine; these are secured on the ends of the mine, adjacent to the pressure plate. There were two FWAM fuzes - one mechanical and one electronic. They were fitted at the opposite end of the pressure pad to the A/D fuze. Mines equipped with these fuzes were deployed using the Barmine Layer.

A training version of the mine is bio-degradable, and consists of sand or peat in a cardboard casing.

== Service ==
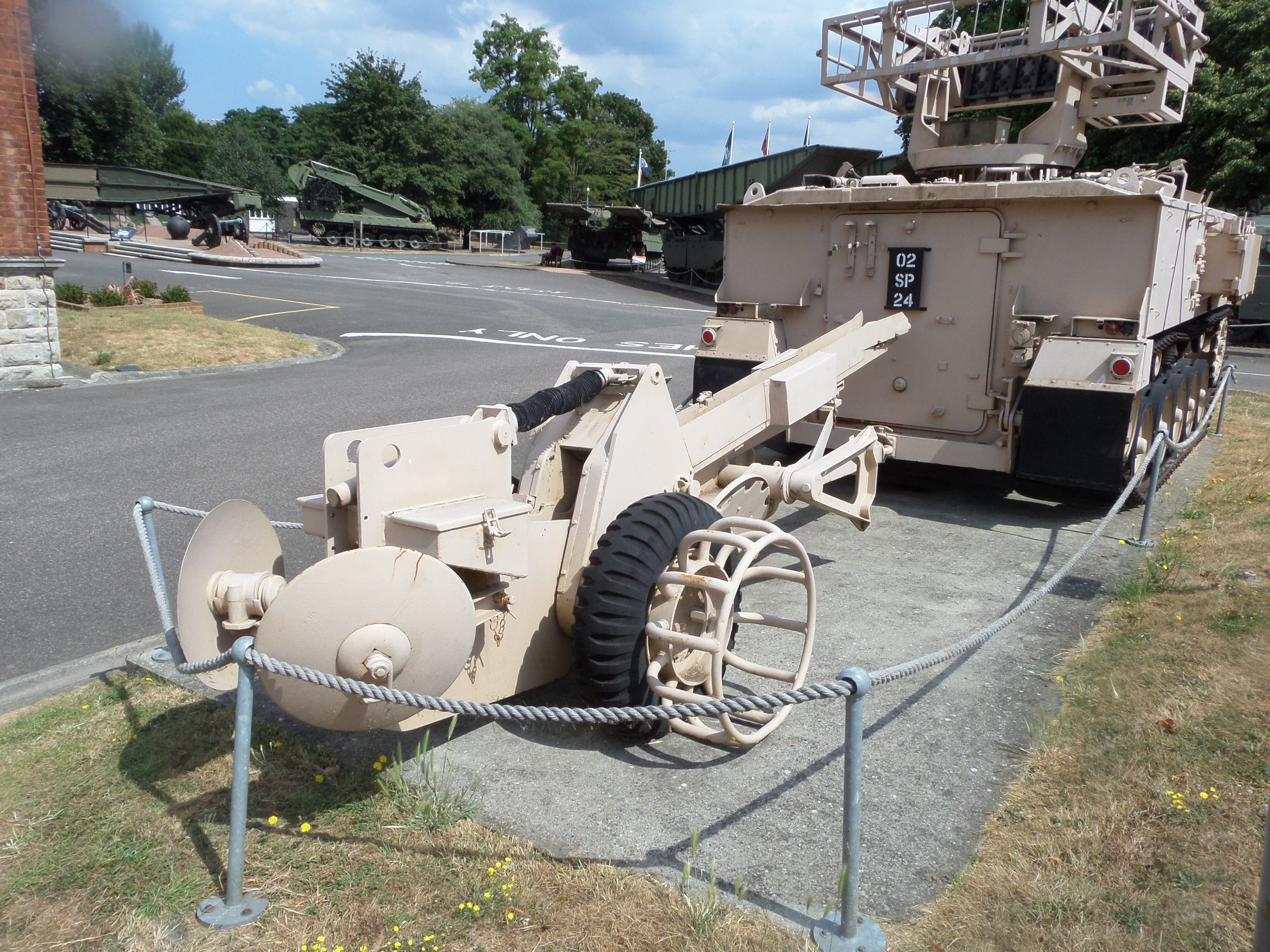
FV432 and plough minelayer

The L9 bar mine entered British service in 1969. A number of sub-variants of the mine exist, designated L9A1 through L9A8. It was replaced as an anti-tank mine in British service (by the Shielder minelaying system) in 2010.

The bar mine was used by small detachments of special forces of the British Army during the Gulf War in 1991. A number were captured from Kuwaiti Army stocks by the Iraqi Army in 1990, and subsequently used by them in the same conflict. It was reported that they disabled a number of M60A1 Rise Passive Patton tanks and other armoured vehicles belonging to the United States Marine Corps, even when these were fitted with mine-clearing ploughs. Unless the plough struck the mine squarely in the centre, the mine would often be rotated into a position in which it would pass between the tines of the plough, then blow up the track and front roller of the tank.

The British Army has since been using bar mines simply as breaching frame charges, for instance to blow holes in tough compound walls in Afghanistan and Iraq.

Among other users have been Denmark, where it was introduced as the Pansermine M/75, with the mine plough towed by the M113 armored personnel carrier. In 1989 an electromagnetic FWAM fuse replaced the original fuse as Pansermine M/88. Both mines have since been taken out of use.

== Theft from MOD train ==
In 2012, a parcel of forty bar mines being shipped by rail on a Ministry Of Defence (MOD) train from DMC Longtown to Oxfordshire disappeared while in transit. Twenty-eight were recovered promptly alongside the line near Warrington, but twelve (approximately 100 kg of RDX) were missing, Counter-terrorism officers together with the Royal Military Police led the enquiry. Five men were later jailed for their part in the theft and the missing explosives were recovered.

== Specifications ==
- Weight: 11 kilograms (24 lb)
- Explosive content: 8.4 kilograms (19 lb) of RDX/TNT
- Length: 1.2 metres (47 in)
- Height: 0.082 metres (3.2 in)
- Width: 0.108 metres (4.3 in)
- Operating pressure: 140 kilograms (310 lb)
