= 320th Regiment =

320th Regiment may refer to:

- 320th Armored Cavalry Regiment, United States
- 320th Cavalry Regiment, United States
- 320th Field Artillery Regiment, United States
- 320th (South Midland) Heavy Anti-Aircraft Regiment, Royal Artillery

== See also ==
- 1st Battalion, 320th Field Artillery Regiment
- 2nd Battalion, 320th Field Artillery Regiment
- 3rd Battalion, 320th Field Artillery Regiment
- 4th Battalion, 320th Field Artillery Regiment
