= 3rd Battalion, 320th Field Artillery Regiment =

3rd Battalion, 320th Field Artillery
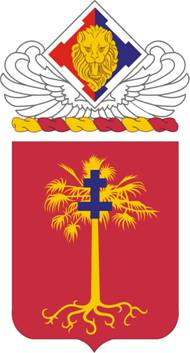
- 320th Field Artillery Regiment coat of arms
- Active: 1917–present
- Country: United States
- Branch: Regular Army
- Type: Field artillery
- Size: Battalion
- Part of: 101st Airborne Division Artillery
- Garrison/HQ: Fort Campbell
- Nickname: "Red Knight Rakkasans"
- Motto: "Volens Et Potens"
- Equipment: M119A3 Howitzer; M777A2 Howitzer
- Engagements: World War I World War II; Operations Desert Shield & Desert Storm; Operation Enduring Freedom, Afghanistan; Operation Iraqi Freedom

Insignia
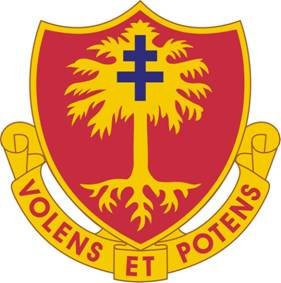
- Distinctive unit insignia

- Background trimming

The 3rd Battalion, 320th Field Artillery Regiment (3-320th FAR) is a Field Artillery Branch battalion assigned to the 3rd Brigade Combat Team, 101st Airborne Division. The battalion has been assigned to the 82nd Airborne Division, 11th Airborne Division and 101st Airborne Division. The battalion has participated in World War I, World War II, Operation Desert Storm, Operation Enduring Freedom, and Operation Iraqi Freedom.

== History ==
=== World War I ===
The 3-320th FAR's beginnings can be traced back to America's entry into World War I. As part of U.S. mobilization, 3-320th was constituted, organized and activated in August 1917 as Battery C, 320th Field Artillery (C/320th FA). As part of the original 82nd Division, C/320th FA played a key role at Lorraine, St. Mihiel, and the Meuse Argonne region in France.

=== Interwar period ===
The 320th Field Artillery arrived at the port of New York on 7 May 1919 on the troopship USS Kentuckian and was demobilized on 12 May 1919 at Camp Dix, New Jersey. Pursuant to the National Defense Act of 1920, it was reconstituted in the Organized Reserve on 24 June 1921, assigned to the 82nd Division, and allotted to the Fourth Corps Area. The regiment was initiated on 7 December 1921 with regimental headquarters at Columbia, South Carolina. Subordinate battalion headquarters were concurrently organized as follows: 1st Battalion at Greenville, South Carolina, and 2nd Battalion at Sumter, South Carolina. The regimental headquarters was relocated on 8 July 1927 to Spartanburg, South Carolina. The regiment conducted annual summer training with the 2nd Battalion, 16th Field Artillery Regiment at Fort Bragg, North Carolina, and also conducted Citizens' Military Training Camps at Fort Bragg some years as an alternate form of summer training. The primary ROTC "feeder" school for new Reserve lieutenants for the regiment was The Citadel in Charleston, South Carolina.

=== World War II ===
In August 1942, when the 82nd Infantry Division was converted to an airborne division, the 320th FA (including C/320th) was reorganized and redesignated as the 320th Glider Field Artillery Battalion (GFAB). As part of the 82nd Airborne Division, the 320th GFAB fought in a number of hot spots. First, the 320th GFAB was part of the campaign in Sicily, acting in reserve. The unit first saw action at the Volturno River on the Italian mainland. The crucial Normandy invasion was the next stop for the 320th GFAB. Under difficult conditions, the unit helped make the invasion a success. As a result of the 320th's actions during Operation Overlord, the unit was awarded the Presidential Unit Citation and two French Croix de Guerre. The 320th GFAB next fought in Operation Market Garden and then the Battle of the Bulge when the Germans attempted their last-ditch offensive. The 320th GFAB then fought and played a role in the final push through the Rhineland to defeat Germany. Upon the war's end the unit completed its duties in Europe as part of the post-war occupation in Berlin.

=== Early Cold War ===
After the war, the 320th GFAB went through a number of transitions. It was inactivated on 15 December 1948 and relieved from assignment to the 82nd Airborne Division on 14 December 1950. On 1 August 1951 it was reorganized and redesignated as the 320th Airborne Field Artillery Battalion (AFAB), and activated at Fort Benning, Georgia with the 508th Airborne Regimental Combat Team (ARCT). The battalion served with the 508th ARCT at Fort Benning, Georgia, from 1951-1953, then moved to Fort Campbell, Kentucky, and became part of the 11th Airborne Division. In June–July 1955, the battalion moved with the 508th to Japan, replacing the 187th ARCT's 674th Airborne Field Artillery Battalion.
When the Army eliminated infantry regiments and battalions from division and organized under the Pentomic structure, the 320th Field Artillery was reorganized as a parent regiment under the Combat Arms Regimental System. C/320th FA was initially assigned to the 11th Airborne Division in Germany on 1 March 1957, and inactivated on 1 July 1958 when the 11th Airborne was replaced by the 24th Infantry Division. The battery was reactivated on 1 July 1960, and served at Fort Bragg with the 82nd Airborne Division. As part of the restructuring to the Reorganization Objective Army Division, the battery was inactivated 25 May 1964.
C/320th FA were redesignated on 3 July 1968 as Headquarters and Headquarters Battery, 3rd Battalion, 320th Artillery (3-320th Arty), and assigned once again to the 82nd Airborne Division. The battalion was activated to replace the 2-321st FA, which had deployed to Vietnam, in the strategic reserve. 3-320th again inactivated when the 2-321st returned from Vietnam in 1969.

=== Late Cold War ===
As part of the transition to the U.S. Army Regimental System in 1986, the 3-320th was activated in the 101st Airborne Division at Fort Campbell, Kentucky, by reflagging the 3-319th.

=== Gulf War ===
3-320 FAR next saw action in the Middle East from 1990 until 1991. As a part of the 101st Airborne Division (Air Assault), the battalion was part of the massive US force that drove the Iraqi Army from Kuwait. The 3-320 FAR was commanded during Operation Desert Shield and Operation Desert Storm by LTC Thomas J. Costello.

== Lineage and honors ==
=== Lineage ===
- Constituted 5 August 1917 in the National Army as Battery C, 320th Field Artillery, an element of the 82d Division
- Organized 29 August 1917 at Camp Gordon, Georgia
- Demobilized 12 May 1919 at Camp Dix, New Jersey
- Reconstituted 24 June 1921 in the Organized Reserves as Battery C, 320th Field Artillery, an element of the 82d Division (later redesignated as the 82d Airborne Division)
- Organized in December 1921 at Columbia, South Carolina
- Reorganized and redesignated 13 February 1942 as Battery C, 320th Field Artillery Battalion
- Ordered into active military service 25 March 1942 and reorganized at Camp Claiborne, Louisiana
- Reorganized and redesignated 15 August 1942 as the 320th Glider Field Artillery Battalion

(Organized Reserves redesignated 25 March 1948 as the Organized Reserve Corps)

- Withdrawn 15 November 1948 from the Organized Reserve Corps and allotted to the Regular Army
- Inactivated 15 December 1948 at Fort Bragg, North Carolina

(320th Glider Field Artillery Battalion relieved 14 December 1950 from assignment to the 82d Airborne Division)

- Redesignated 1 August 1951 as Battery C, 320th Airborne Field Artillery Battalion, and activated at Fort Benning, Georgia
- Reorganized and redesignated 1 March 1957 as Battery C, 320th Artillery, and assigned to the 11th Airborne Division
- Inactivated 1 July 1958 in Germany and relieved from assignment to the 11th Airborne Division
- Assigned 1 July 1960 to the 82d Airborne Division and activated at Fort Bragg, North Carolina
- Inactivated 25 May 1964 at Fort Bragg, North Carolina, and relieved from assignment to the 82d Airborne Division
- Redesignated 3 July 1968 as Headquarters and Headquarters Battery, 3d Battalion, 320th Artillery, and assigned to the 82d Airborne Division (organic elements concurrently constituted)
- Battalion activated 15 July 1968 at Fort Bragg, North Carolina
- Inactivated 15 December 1969 at Fort Bragg, North Carolina, and relieved from assignment to the 82d Airborne Division
- Redesignated 1 September 1971 as the 3d Battalion, 320th Field Artillery
- Assigned 2 October 1980 to the 101st Airborne Division and activated at Fort Campbell, Kentucky
- Relieved 16 September 2004 from assignment to the 101st Airborne Division and assigned to the 3rd Brigade Combat Team, 101st Airborne Division

=== Campaign participation credit ===
- World War I: St. Mihiel; Meuse-Argonne; Lorraine 1918
- World War II: Sicily; Naples-Foggia; Normandy (with arrowhead); Rhineland (with arrowhead); Ardennes-Alsace; Central Europe
- Southwest Asia: Defense of Saudi Arabia; Liberation and Defense of Kuwait
- War on Terrorism
  - Afghanistan:
  - Iraq: Iraqi Governance

Note: The published Army lineage, dated 18 September 1996, shows no campaigns for the War on Terrorism. Comparison of the battalion's deployment dates with the War on Terrorism campaigns estimates that the battalion will be credited with participation in the additional campaigns listed.

=== Decorations ===
- Presidential Unit Citation (Army) for STE. MERE EGLISE
- Valorous Unit Award for IRAQ 2007-2008
- Valorous Unit Award for AFGHANISTAN 2010
- Meritorious Unit Commendation (Army) for SOUTHWEST ASIA
- Meritorious Unit Commendation (Army) for IRAQ 2003
- French Croix de Guerre with Palm, World War II for STE. MERE EGLISE
- French Croix de Guerre with Palm, World War II for COTENTIN
- French Croix de Guerre, World War II, Fourragere
- Military Order of William (Degree of the Knight of the Fourth Class) for NIJMEGEN 1944
- Netherlands Orange Lanyard
- Belgian Fourragere 1940
  - Cited in the Order of the Day of the Belgian Army for action in the ARDENNES
  - Cited in the Order of the Day of the Belgian Army for action in BELGIUM AND GERMANY
