= 101st Airborne Division Artillery =

101st Airborne DIVARTY
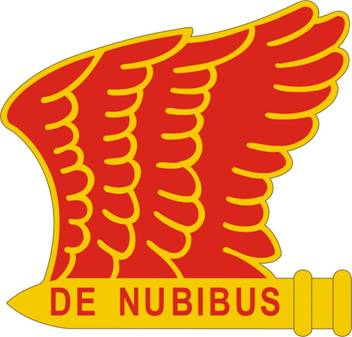
- Distinctive unit insignia
- Country: United States of America
- Branch: United States Army
- Type: Field artillery
- Role: Division force fires HQ
- Size: Brigade
- Part of: 101st Airborne Division
- Garrison/HQ: Fort Campbell, Kentucky
- Nickname: "Guns of Glory"
- Equipment: M119A3 howitzer M777A2 howitzer

Commanders
- Current commander: COL Aaron Thomas
- Command Sergeant Major: CSM Rudy Rodriguez
- Notable commanders: BG Anthony McAuliffe

Insignia
- Background trimming

The 101st Airborne Division Artillery (DIVARTY) is the force fires headquarters for the 101st Airborne Division (Air Assault) at Fort Campbell, Kentucky. The DIVARTY has served with the division in World War II, Vietnam, Operations Desert Shield and Storm, Operation Iraqi Freedom, and in peacetime at Camp Breckinridge and Fort Campbell, Kentucky, and Fort Jackson, South Carolina. The DIVARTY was inactivated in 2005 as part of transformation to modular brigade combat teams, but was reactivated on 16 October 2014 to provide fire support coordination and mission command for the training and readiness of field artillery units across the division.

== History ==
The 176th Field Artillery Brigade was constituted in the Organized Reserve on 24 June 1921, assigned to the 101st Division in the Sixth Corps Area with its headquarters in Milwaukee, Wisconsin. The brigade consisted of two 75mm gun regiments (the 376th and 377th Field Artillery regiments) and the 326th Ammunition Train. In 1929, a 155mm howitzer regiment (the 378th Field Artillery, replaced within a month with the 572nd Field Artillery) was added to the brigade when the Army adopted a lighter 155mm howitzer. The brigade conducted its summer training at Camps Custer and McCoy in Wisconsin.

=== World War II ===
During World War II, the 101st Airborne DIVARTY took part in four campaigns, earning Arrowhead devices for taking part in assault landings during Normandy and the Rhineland campaigns. It was also awarded a Presidential Unit Citation for its actions at the Battle of the Bulge, a French Croix de Guerre with Palm for action at Normandy, a Netherlands Orange Lanyard, and Belgian Fourragere 1940. It was not deployed for combat during the Korean War, but during the Vietnam it fought in a dozen of the 17 named campaigns and was the recipient of a Republic of Vietnam Cross of Gallantry with Palm and a Civil Action Honor Medal, First Class.

=== Vietnam ===
The 101st Airborne Division Artillery deployed to Vietnam as part of Operation Eagle Thrust, from 3–18 December 1967. During the first 30 days, DIVARTY units integrated into the existing artillery fires of their base camps, while concurrently executing a required, in-country training program. The 2nd Battalion, 320th Field Artillery, already in Vietnam with the division's 1st Brigade, returned to the Division Artillery in mid-January. During the first six weeks in country, the DIVARTY fired 54,969 rounds of 105mm, and conducted 59 days of training, 10 days of troop movement, and 23 days of combat operations.

Throughout February 1968, the DIVARTY expanded its responsibilities and communications capabilities as the 101st Airborne Division assumed responsibility for larger areas of operation. On 2 February 1968, the DIVARTY assumed responsibility for coordinating fires in AO Uniontown Center and North. On 7 February 1968, the 2nd Battalion, 11th Field Artillery (- Battery A) was attached to the DIVARTY, providing a 155mm reinforcing capability. From 17 to 23 February, personnel from HHB, 2-319th and 1-321st received M18 Field Artillery Digital Automatic Computer (FADAC) training from 1st Infantry Division Artillery, to operate FADAC computers issued on 9 February 1968. When 3rd Brigade, 82nd Airborne Division arrived in Vietnam and came under the operational control of the 101st, the DIVARTY assumed responsibility for the 2-321 which was attached to the brigade. On 1 March 1968, the DIVARTY Fire Direction Center (FDC) coordinated the fires of five batteries in support of B/2-506 Infantry. In early March, the DIVARTY moved to the I Corps Tactical Zone (CTZ), the DIVARTY passed fire control for AO Uniontown to 2nd Battalion, 40th Field Artillery. On 8 March 1968, the drivers from HHB DIVARTY and HSB/2-11 left Bien Hoa for sea embarkation in Saigon. The remaining personnel moved by air on 15 March 1968. On 17 March 1968, seaborne elements arrived at Da Nang and moved to Camp Eagle, establishing the DIVARTY operations center on 18 March. In I CTZ, the DIVARTY began receiving heavy general support artillery from Provisional Corps Vietnam Artillery, and B/2-11 arrived in the division AO as a reinforcing medium battery. On 31 March 1968, the DIVARTY received a 105mm battery (A/1-40, replaced on 16 April by C/6-33). On 15 April, C/6-16 was attached to the DIVARTY as a third reinforcing medium battery, and subsequently attached to 2-11. During February - April, the DIVARTY's three organic 105mm battalions fired over 200,000 rounds in support of the division's infantry.

=== Global War on Terror ===
In February and March 2003, the DIVARTY deployed to Kuwait in preparation for Operation Iraqi Freedom. The DIVARTY provided close support fires to the division's attack north into Iraq, including the battles of Karbala, An Najaf, Kifl and Al Hilla. Following the liberation of Bagdad, the DIVARTY conducted stability operations around the city of Mosul before redeploying in the spring of 2004. As part of the Army's transformation to modular brigade combat teams, the DIVARTY was inactivated in 2005 at Fort Campbell.

In October 2014, as part of another restructuring, the DIVARTY was reactivated at Fort Campbell. The unit will have a dual mission: provide the 101st Airborne Division with a Force Fires Headquarters to plan, integrate and employ Joint Fires for the division; and provide trained and read Field Artillery units and fire support elements for the division's brigade combat teams.

== Lineage and honors ==
=== Lineage ===
- Constituted 24 June 1921 in the Organized Reserves as Headquarters and Headquarters Battery, 176th Field Artillery Brigade
- Organized in 1923 in Wisconsin
- Reorganized and redesignated 30 January 1942 as Headquarters and Headquarters Battery, 101st Division Artillery
- Disbanded 15 August 1942; concurrently reconstituted in the Army of the United States as Headquarters and Headquarters Battery, 101st Airborne Division Artillery, and activated at Camp Claiborne, Louisiana
- Inactivated 30 November 1945 in France
- Allotted 25 June 1948 to the Regular Army
- Activated 6 July 1948 at Camp Breckinridge, Kentucky
- Inactivated 27 May 1949 at Camp Breckinridge, Kentucky
- Activated 25 August 1950 at Camp Breckinridge, Kentucky
- Inactivated 1 December 1953 at Camp Breckinridge, Kentucky
- Activated 15 May 1954 at Fort Jackson, South Carolina
- Reorganized and redesignated 1 July 1956 as Headquarters, Headquarters and Service Battery, 101st Airborne Division Artillery
- Reorganized and redesignated 25 April 1957 as Headquarters and Headquarters Battery, 101st Airborne Division Artillery
- Inactivated 15 June 2005 at Fort Campbell, Kentucky
- Activated 16 October 2014 at Fort Campbell, Kentucky

=== Campaign participation credit ===
- World War II: Normandy (with arrowhead); Rhineland (with arrowhead); Ardennes-Alsace; Central Europe
- Vietnam: Counteroffensive, Phase III; Tet Counteroffensive; Counteroffensive, Phase IV; Counteroffensive, Phase V; Counteroffensive, Phase VI; Tet 69/Counteroffensive; Summer-Fall 1969; Winter-Spring 1970; Sanctuary Counteroffensive; Counteroffensive, Phase VII; Consolidation I; Consolidation II;
- Southwest Asia: Defense of Saudi Arabia; Liberation and Defense of Kuwait;
- War on Terrorism: Campaigns to be determined
  - Iraq: Liberation of Iraq, Transition of Iraq

Note: the official Army lineage, published 15 February 2015, lists "Campaigns to be determined". Estimate that the unit will be entitled to campaign credit for two campaigns based on deployment dates.

=== Decorations ===
- Presidential Unit Citation (Army), Streamer embroidered BASTOGNE
- Meritorious Unit Commendation (Army), Streamer embroidered SOUTHWEST ASIA 1990–1991
- Meritorious Unit Commendation (Army), Streamer embroidered IRAQ 2003
- French Croix de Guerre with Palm, World War II, Streamer embroidered NORMANDY
- Netherlands Orange Lanyard Belgian Croix de Guerre 1940 with Palm, Streamer embroidered BASTOGNE; cited in the Order of the Day of the Belgian Army for action at Bastogne
- Belgian Fourragere 1940

Cited in the Order of the Day of the Belgian Army for action in France and Belgium

- Republic of Vietnam Cross of Gallantry with Palm, Streamer embroidered VIETNAM 1968–1969
- Republic of Vietnam Civil Action Honor Medal, First Class, Streamer embroidered VIETNAM 1968–1970

== Heraldry ==
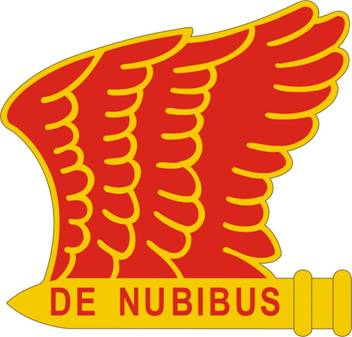

- Description/Blazon: A gold metal and enamel device 1 1/16 inches (2.70 cm) in height overall consisting of a winged gold artillery shell charged with the motto "DE NUBIBUS" (From the Clouds) in scarlet lettering, the wing scarlet.
- Symbolism: In the scarlet and gold of the Artillery, the airborne character of the division is indicated by the winged shell.
- Background: The distinctive unit insignia was approved on 13 November 1942. It was amended to correct the spelling of the motto on 21 November 1968.

== See also ==
- 101st Airborne Division
- 320th Field Artillery Regiment
- 321st Field Artillery Regiment
- 377th Field Artillery Regiment
- 2nd Battalion, 319th Field Artillery Regiment
- 3rd Battalion, 319th Field Artillery Regiment
- 1st Battalion, 320th Field Artillery Regiment
- 2nd Battalion, 320th Field Artillery Regiment
- 3rd Battalion, 320th Field Artillery Regiment
- 1st Battalion, 321st Field Artillery Regiment
- 907th Glider Field Artillery Battalion
