= 4th Battalion, 320th Field Artillery Regiment =

4th Battalion, 320th Field Artillery
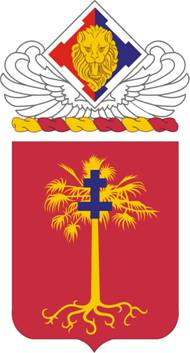
- 320th Field Artillery Regiment Coat of arms
- Active: 1917–2014
- Country: United States
- Branch: Regular Army
- Type: Field artillery
- Size: Battalion
- Part of: inactive
- Motto: "Volens Et Potens"
- Engagements: World War I World War II; Operations Desert Shield & Desert Storm; Operation Enduring Freedom, Afghanistan; Operation Iraqi Freedom

Insignia
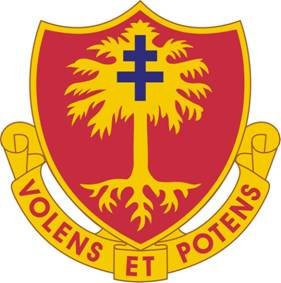
- Distinctive unit insignia

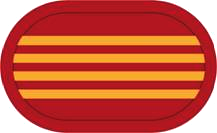
- Background trimming

The 4th Battalion, 320th Field Artillery Regiment (4-320th FAR) is an inactive field artillery battalion of the United States Army. The battalion has been assigned to the 82nd Airborne Division, 11th Airborne Division and 101st Airborne Division. The battalion has participated in World War I, World War II, Operation Just Cause, Operation Iraqi Freedom, and Operation Enduring Freedom. The battalion inactivated in 2014 as part of ongoing force reductions.

== History ==
=== World War I ===
The 4-320th FAR's beginnings can be traced back to America's entry into the World War I. As part of the nation's mobilization, 4-320th was constituted, organized and activated in August 1917 as Battery D, 320th Field Artillery (D/320th FA). As part of the original 82nd Division, D/320th FA played a key role at Lorraine, St. Mihiel, and the Meuse Argonne region in France.

=== Interwar period ===
The 320th Field Artillery arrived at the port of New York on 7 May 1919 on the troopship USS Kentuckian and was demobilized on 12 May 1919 at Camp Dix, New Jersey. Pursuant to the National Defense Act of 1920, it was reconstituted in the Organized Reserve on 24 June 1921, assigned to the 82nd Division, and allotted to the Fourth Corps Area. The regiment was initiated on 7 December 1921 with regimental headquarters at Columbia, South Carolina. Subordinate battalion headquarters were concurrently organized as follows: 1st Battalion at Greenville, South Carolina, and 2nd Battalion at Sumter, South Carolina. The regimental headquarters was relocated on 8 July 1927 to Spartanburg, South Carolina. The regiment conducted annual summer training with the 2nd Battalion, 16th Field Artillery Regiment at Fort Bragg, North Carolina, and also conducted Citizens' Military Training Camps at Fort Bragg some years as an alternate form of summer training. The primary ROTC "feeder" school for new Reserve lieutenants for the regiment was The Citadel in Charleston, South Carolina.

=== World War II ===
In August 1942, when the 82nd Infantry Division was converted to an airborne division, the 320th FA was reorganized and redesignated as the 320th Glider Field Artillery Battalion (GFAB). Because the GFAB had only three firing batteries, the lineage of D/320th was consolidated with A/320th. As part of the 82nd Airborne Division, the 320th GFAB fought in a number of hot spots. First, the 320th GFAB was part of the campaign in Sicily, acting in reserve. The unit first saw action at the Volturno River on the Italian mainland. The crucial Normandy invasion was the next stop for the 320th GFAB. Under difficult conditions, the unit helped make the invasion a success. As a result of the 320th's actions during Operation Overlord, the unit was awarded the Presidential Unit Citation. The 320th GFAB next fought in Operation Market Garden and then the Battle of the Bulge when the Germans attempted their last-ditch offensive. The 320th GFAB then fought and played a role in the final push through the Rhineland to defeat Germany. Upon the war's end the unit completed its duties in Europe as part of the post-war occupation in Berlin.

=== Early Cold War ===
After the war, the 320th GFAB went through a number of transitions. It was inactivated on 15 December 1948 and relieved from assignment to the 82nd Airborne Division on 14 December 1950. On 1 August 1951 it was reorganized and redesignated as the 320th Airborne Field Artillery Battalion (AFAB), and activated at Fort Benning, Georgia.
During the 1950s, the 320th FA served as the field artillery battalion of the separate 508th Airborne Regimental Combat Team. When the Army eliminated infantry regiments and battalions from division and organized under the Pentomic structure, the 320th Field Artillery was reorganized as a parent regiment under the Combat Arms Regimental System. D/320th was assigned to the 82nd Airborne Division until 1964, but inactivated when the Army restructured to the Reorganization Objective Army Division in 1964.

=== Late Cold War ===
As part of the transition to the U.S. Army Regimental System in 1986, D/320th was activated in the 193rd Infantry Brigade in the Panama Canal Zone. The battery participated in Operation Just Cause before being inactivated again in 1994.

=== Global War on Terror ===
As part the Army's reorganization to modular brigade combat teams, D/320th was redesignated as Headquarters and Headquarters Battery, 4th Battalion, 320th Field Artillery. The battalion activated on 16 September 2004 at Fort Campbell, Kentucky and assigned to the 4th Brigade Combat Team, 101st Airborne Division.

With the 4th BCT, 4-320th FAR deployed to Iraq in support of Operation Iraqi Freedom from 2005–2006, and to Afghanistan in support of Operation Enduring Freedom from 2008–2009, 2010–2011, and in 2013.

== Lineage and honors ==
=== Lineage ===
- Constituted 5 August 1917 in the National Army as Battery D, 320th Field Artillery, an element of the 82d Division
- Organized 29 August 1917 at Camp Gordon, Georgia
- Demobilized 12 May 1919 at Camp Dix, New Jersey
- Reconstituted 24 June 1921 in the Organized Reserves as Battery D, 320th Field Artillery, an element of the 82d Division (later redesignated as the 82d Airborne Division)
- Organized in December 1921 at Columbia, South Carolina
- Absorbed 13 February 1942 by Battery A, 320th Field Artillery Battalion

(Battery A, 320th Field Artillery, reorganized and redesignated 13 February 1942 as Battery A, 320th Field Artillery Battalion; ordered into active military service 25 March 1942 and reorganized at Camp Claiborne, Louisiana; reorganized and redesignated 15 August 1942 as Battery A, 320th Glider Field Artillery Battalion; [Organized Reserves redesignated 25 March 1948 as the Organized Reserve Corps]; withdrawn 15 November 1948 from the Organized Reserve Corps and allotted to the Regular Army; inactivated 15 December 1948 at Fort Bragg, North Carolina; [320th Glider Field Artillery Battalion relieved 14 December 1950 from assignment to the 82d Airborne Division]; redesignated 1 August 1951 as Battery A, 320th Airborne Field Artillery Battalion, and activated at Fort Benning, Georgia)

- Former Battery D, 320th Field Artillery, reconstituted 22 March 1957 in the Regular Army and redesignated as Battery D, 320th Artillery
- Assigned 1 September 1957 to the 82d Airborne Division and activated at Fort Bragg, North Carolina
- Inactivated 25 May 1964 at Fort Bragg, North Carolina, and relieved from assignment to the 82d Airborne Division
- Redesignated 1 September 1971 as Battery D, 320th Field Artillery
- Assigned 2 October 1986 to the 193d Infantry Brigade and activated in the Canal Zone
- Inactivated 15 October 1994 in Panama and relieved from assignment to the 193d Infantry Brigade
- Redesignated 17 March 2004 as Headquarters and Headquarters Battery, 4th Battalion, 320th Field Artillery (organic elements concurrently constituted)
- Battalion assigned 16 September 2004 to the 4th Brigade Combat Team, 101st Airborne Division, and activated at Fort Campbell, Kentucky
- Redesignated 1 October 2005 as the 4th Battalion, 320th Field Artillery Regiment

=== Campaign participation credit ===
- World War I: *St. Mihiel; *Meuse-Argonne; *Lorraine 1918
- World War II: *Sicily; *Naples-Foggia; *Normandy (with arrowhead); *Rhineland (with arrowhead); *Ardennes-Alsace; *Central Europe
- Armed Forces Expeditions: *Panama
- War on Terrorism:
  - Afghanistan: Consolidation II, Consolidation III, Transition I
  - Iraq: Iraqi Governance, National Resolution

The official lineage published by the Center for Military History lists "Iraq" as the sole campaign in the War on Terrorism. Comparison of the battalion's deployments with Iraq and Afghanistan campaigns estimates that the battalion will be credited with participation in the listed campaigns.

=== Decorations ===
- Presidential Unit Citation (Army) for STE. MERE EGLISE
- Meritorious Unit Commendation for IRAQ 2005–2006
- Meritorious Unit Commendation for AFGHANISTAN 2008–2009
- Meritorious Unit Commendation for AFGHANISTAN 2013
- French Croix de Guerre with Palm, World War II for STE. MERE EGLISE
- French Croix de Guerre with Palm, World War II for COTENTIN
- French Croix de Guerre, World War II, Fourragere
- Military Order of William (Degree of the Knight of the Fourth Class) for NIJMEGEN 1944
- Netherlands Orange Lanyard
- Belgian Fourragere 1940
  - Cited in the Order of the Day of the Belgian Army for action in the Ardennes
  - Cited in the Order of the Day of the Belgian Army for action in Belgium and Germany

Note: Separately cited awards are not posted to the official lineage.

== Heraldry ==
=== Distinctive unit insignia ===
320th Field Artillery Regiment Distinctive Unit Insignia

=== Coat of arms ===
320th Field Artillery Regiment Coat of Arms
