= 2nd Battalion, 320th Field Artillery Regiment =

US army unit

2nd Battalion, 320th Field Artillery
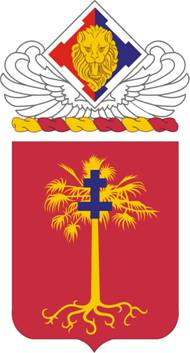
- 320th Field Artillery Regiment coat of arms
- Active: 1917–2015
- Country: United States
- Branch: Regular Army
- Type: Field artillery
- Size: Battalion
- Part of: 1st Brigade Combat Team, 101st Airborne Division
- Garrison/HQ: Fort Campbell
- Nickname: "Balls of the Eagle"
- Motto: "Volens Et Potens"
- Equipment: 105mm and 155mm howitzers
- Engagements: World War I World War II; Operation Power Pack; Vietnam; Operation Desert Storm; Operation Iraqi Freedom; Operations Enduring Freedom

Insignia
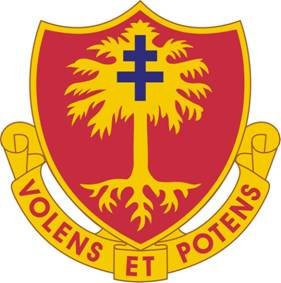
- Distinctive unit insignia

- Background trimming

The 2nd Battalion, 320th Field Artillery Regiment (2-320th FAR) is an inactive field artillery battalion of the United States Army. The battalion has been assigned to the 82nd Airborne Division, 11th Airborne Division and 101st Airborne Division. The battalion has participated in World War I, World War II, Vietnam, Operation Desert Storm, Operation Iraqi Freedom, and Operation Enduring Freedom. The battalion deactivated in July 2015 as part of ongoing force reductions, and its personnel and equipment were reflagged as the 2nd Battalion, 32nd Field Artillery Regiment.

== History ==
=== World War I ===
The 2-320th FAR's beginnings can be traced back to America's entry into the First World War. As part of the nation's mobilization, 2-320th was constituted, organized and activated in August 1917 as Battery B, 320th Field Artillery (B/320th FA). As part of the original 82nd Division, B/320th FA played a key role at Lorraine, St. Mihiel, and the Meuse Argonne region in France.

=== Interwar period ===
The 320th Field Artillery arrived at the port of New York on 7 May 1919 on the troopship USS Kentuckian and was demobilized on 12 May 1919 at Camp Dix, New Jersey. Pursuant to the National Defense Act of 1920, it was reconstituted in the Organized Reserve on 24 June 1921, assigned to the 82nd Division, and allotted to the Fourth Corps Area. The regiment was initiated on 7 December 1921 with regimental headquarters at Columbia, South Carolina. Subordinate battalion headquarters were concurrently organized as follows: 1st Battalion at Greenville, South Carolina, and 2nd Battalion at Sumter, South Carolina. The regimental headquarters was relocated on 8 July 1927 to Spartanburg, South Carolina. The regiment conducted annual summer training with the 2nd Battalion, 16th Field Artillery Regiment at Fort Bragg, North Carolina, and also conducted Citizens' Military Training Camps at Fort Bragg some years as an alternate form of summer training. The primary ROTC "feeder" school for new Reserve lieutenants for the regiment was The Citadel in Charleston, South Carolina.

=== World War II ===
In August 1942, when the 82nd Infantry Division was converted to an airborne division, the 320th FA (including B/320th) was reorganized and redesignated as the 320th Glider Field Artillery Battalion (GFAB). As part of the 82nd Airborne Division, the 320th GFAB fought in a number of hot spots. First, the 320th GFAB was part of the campaign in Sicily, acting in reserve. The unit first saw action at the Volturno River on the Italian mainland. The crucial Normandy invasion was the next stop for the 320th GFAB. Under difficult conditions, the unit helped make the invasion a success. As a result of the 320th's actions during Operation Overlord, the unit was awarded the Presidential Unit Citation. The 320th GFAB next fought in Operation Market Garden and then the Battle of the Bulge when the Germans attempted their last-ditch offensive. The 320th GFAB then fought and played a role in the final push through the Rhineland to defeat Germany. Upon the war's end the unit completed its duties in Europe as part of the post-war occupation in Berlin.

=== Post-World War II ===
After the war, the 320th GFAB went through a number of transitions. It was inactivated on 15 December 1948 and relieved from assignment to the 82nd Airborne Division on 14 December 1950. On 1 August 1951 it was reorganized and redesignated as the 320th Airborne Field Artillery Battalion (AFAB), and activated at Fort Benning, Georgia.

=== Post-Korean War ===
During the 1950s, the 320th FA served as the field artillery battalion of the separate 508th Airborne Regimental Combat Team. When the Army eliminated infantry regiments and battalions from division and organized under the Pentomic structure, the 320th Field Artillery was reorganized as a parent regiment under the Combat Arms Regimental System. B/320th FA was assigned to the 11th Airborne Division in Germany. B/320th FA was inactivated on 1 July 1958 in Germany when the 11th Airborne was inactivated and replaced by the 24th Infantry Division. B/320th FA were redesignated on 15 November 1962 as Headquarters and Headquarters Battery, 2nd Battalion, 320th Artillery, and assigned to the 101st Airborne Division (organic elements concurrently constituted).

=== Gulf War ===
2-320 FAR next saw action in the Middle East from 1990 until 1991. As a part of the 101st Airborne Division (Air Assault), the battalion was part of the massive US force that drove the Iraqi Army from Kuwait.

=== Operation Iraqi Freedom I ===
The battalion served honorably in Operation Iraqi Freedom. As a member of the famed 101st Airborne Division, the battalion deployed 3 times to Iraq in support of the operation, to include the initial push into the country 24 March 2003.

== Lineage and honors ==
=== Lineage ===
- Constituted 5 August 1917 in the National Army as Battery B, 320th Field Artillery, an element of the 82d Division
- Organized 29 August 1917 at Camp Gordon, Georgia
- Demobilized 12 May 1919 at Camp Dix, New Jersey
- Reconstituted 24 June 1921 in the Organized Reserves as Battery B, 320th Field Artillery, an element of the 82d Division (later redesignated as the 82d Airborne Division)
- Organized in December 1921 at Columbia, South Carolina
- Reorganized and redesignated 13 February 1942 as Battery B, 320th Field Artillery Battalion
- Ordered into active military service 25 March 1942 and reorganized at Camp Claiborne, Louisiana
- Reorganized and redesignated 15 August 1942 as Battery B, 320th Glider Field Artillery Battalion

(Organized Reserves redesignated 25 March 1948 as the Organized Reserve Corps)

- Withdrawn 15 November 1948 from the Organized Reserve Corps and allotted to the Regular Army
- Inactivated 15 December 1948 at Fort Bragg, North Carolina

(320th Glider Field Artillery Battalion relieved 14 December 1950 from assignment to the 82d Airborne Division)

- Redesignated 1 August 1951 as Battery B, 320th Airborne Field Artillery Battalion, and activated at Fort Benning, Georgia
- Reorganized and redesignated 1 March 1957 as Battery B, 320th Artillery, and assigned to the 11th Airborne Division
- Inactivated 1 July 1958 in Germany and relieved from assignment to the 11th Airborne Division
- Redesignated 15 November 1962 as Headquarters and Headquarters Battery, 2d Battalion, 320th Artillery, and assigned to the 101st Airborne Division (organic elements concurrently constituted)
- Battalion activated 3 December 1962 at Fort Campbell, Kentucky
- Redesignated 1 September 1971 as the 2d Battalion, 320th Field Artillery
- Relieved 16 September 2004 from assignment to the 101st Airborne Division and assigned to the 1st Brigade Combat Team, 101st Airborne Division

=== Campaign participation credit ===
- World War I: St. Mihiel; Meuse-Argonne; Lorraine 1918
- World War II: Sicily; Naples-Foggia; Normandy (with arrowhead); Rhineland (with arrowhead); Ardennes-Alsace; Central Europe
- Vietnam: Defense; Counteroffensive; Counteroffensive, Phase II; Counteroffensive, Phase III; Tet Counteroffensive; Counteroffensive, Phase IV; Counteroffensive, Phase V; Counteroffensive, Phase VI; Tet 69/Counteroffensive; Summer-Fall 1969; Winter Spring 1970; Sanctuary Counteroffensive; Counteroffensive, Phase VII; Consolidation I; Consolidation II
- Southwest Asia: Defense of Saudi Arabia; Liberation and Defense of Kuwait
- War on Terrorism
  - Afghanistan: Afghan Consolidation III
  - Iraq: Liberation of Iraq, Transition of Iraq, Iraqi Governance, Iraqi Surge

Note: The published Army lineage, dated 30 June 2010, shows only Iraqi Governance in the War on Terrorism. Comparison of the battalion's deployment dates with the War on Terrorism campaigns estimates that the battalion will be credited with participation in the additional campaigns listed.

=== Decorations ===
- Presidential Unit Citation (Army), Streamer embroidered STE. MERE EGLISE
- Presidential Unit Citation (Army), Streamer embroidered DAK TO
- Valorous Unit Award, Streamer embroidered TUY HOA
- Meritorius Unit Commendation (Army), Streamer embroidered VIETNAM 1965-1966
- Meritorious Unit Commendation (Army), Streamer embroidered SOUTHWEST ASIA 1990-1991
- Meritorious Unit Commendation (Army), Streamer embroidered IRAQ 2003
- Meritorious Unit Commendation (Army), Streamer embroidered IRAQ 2007-2008
- Meritorious Unit Commendation (Army), Streamer embroidered AFGHANISTAN 2010-2011
- French Crois de Guerre with Palm, World War II, Streamer embroidered STE. MERE EGLISE
- French Crois de Guerre with Palm, World War II, Streamer embroidered COTENTIN
- French Crois de Guerre, World War II Fourrragere
- Military Order of William (Degree of the Knight of the Fourth Class), Streamer embroidered NIJMEGEN 1944
- Netherlands Orange Lanyard
- Belgian Fourragere 1940
  - Cited in the Order of the Day of the Belgian Army for action in the Ardennes
  - Cited in the Order of the Day of the Belgian Army for action in Belgium
- Republic of Vietnam Cross of Gallantry with Palm, Streamer embroidered VIETNAM 1968-1969
- Republic of Vietnam Cross of Gallantry with Palm, Streamer embroidered VIETNAM 1971
- Republic of Vietnam Civil Action Honor Medal, First Class, Streamer embroidered VIETNAM 1968-1970

Battery A additionally entitled to:
- Republic of Vietnam Cross of Gallantry with Palm, Streamer embroidered VIETNAM 1966-1967

Note: Separately cited decorations are not post to the official lineage by the Center for Military History.

== Heraldry ==
=== Distinctive unit insignia ===
320th Field Artillery Regiment Distinctive Unit Insignia

=== Coat of arms ===
320th Field Artillery Regiment Coat of Arms

== See also ==
- Field Artillery Branch (United States)
