= 320th Field Artillery Regiment =

US military unit

320th Field Artillery Regiment (320th FAR)
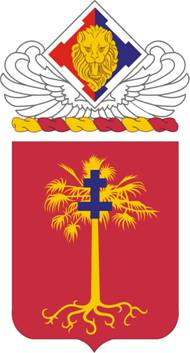
- Coat of arms
- Active: 1917, 1941-1945, 1945-present
- Country: (United States)
- Branch: United States Army
- Type: Field artillery
- Role: USARS parent regiment
- Size: Regiment
- Mottos: VOLENS ET POTENS (Willing and Able)

Insignia
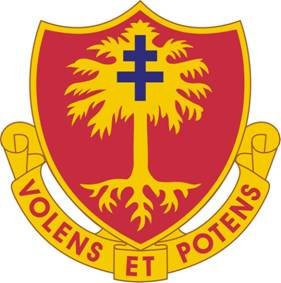
- Distinctive unit insignia

The 320th Field Artillery Regiment (320th FAR) is a field artillery regiment of the United States Army. A parent regiment under the U.S. Army Regimental System, the 320th FAR currently has two active elements in the 101st Airborne Division (Air Assault): 1st Battalion, 320th FAR (1-320th FAR) "Top Guns" in 2nd Brigade Combat Team; and 3rd Battalion, 320th FAR (3-320th FAR) "Red Knight Rakkasans" in 3rd Brigade Combat Team. The regiment served with the 82nd Airborne Division during World Wars I and II, and regimental elements have served with the 82nd and 101st Airborne Division, the 193rd Infantry Brigade and the Berlin Brigade, and conducted combat operations in the Dominican Republic, Vietnam, Grenada, Operations Desert Shield and Storm, and the Global War on Terror.

== Current Status of Regimental Elements ==
- 1st Battalion, 320th Field Artillery Regiment; assigned to the 101st Airborne Division
- 2nd Battalion, 320th Field Artillery Regiment; deactivated on 8 July 2015; reflagged as 2nd Battalion, 32nd Field Artillery Regiment; assigned to the 101st Airborne Division
- 3rd Battalion, 320th Field Artillery Regiment, assigned to the 101st Airborne Division
- 4th Battalion, 320th Field Artillery Regiment, deactivated on 25 April 2014
- Battery E, 320th Field Artillery Regiment, deactivated on 15 August 1994

== History ==
=== World War I ===
Initially formed at Camp Gordon, Georgia, the 320th was part of the 82nd Division's 157th Field Artillery Brigade. On 5 September 1917, a small cadre of Regular Army non-commissioned officers and privates joined officer cadres that had reported on 29 August 1917 after graduating from the three batteries of the 7th Provisional Training Regiment. Draftees from Georgia, Alabama and Tennessee arrived over the next few weeks, but many of these men were transferred in November and replaced by new draftees from Texas, Oklahoma, Iowa and Minnesota and all the states east of the Mississippi River.
Initially, the 320th's six firing batteries shared a single battery of 3-inch guns for training with the other 12 batteries in the brigade. In addition to approximately 10 hours use of the actual guns, the regiment's gun squads conducted training with replicas "crudely made structures fashioned from the trunks of small trees, tin cans, spools, gas pipes and any available material." A second battery of guns arrived in December, and from December 1917 through May 1918, the regiment conducted firing practice at Blackjack Mountain near Marietta, Georgia.
Beginning 8 May 1918, the regiment moved by train to Camp Mills, New York, and then shipped to Liverpool, England on the ship City of Exeter, arriving on 31 May 1918. After a brief stop, the regiment crossed the English Channel from Southampton to Le Havre, France and then moved by train to La Courtine. There, the 320th was fully equipped with 75mm guns and conducted two months of training, culminating in a brigade live fire.
From 5–10 August, the 320th moved into a reserve position behind Chateau Thierry, but was not employed and moved by train to Toul and then occupied defensive positions in the Marbache sector with the 157th/82nd. On 22 August, Battery F fired the brigade's first 75mm rounds against Norroy. In preparation for the St. Mihiel Offensive, the regiment moved into forward gun positions constructed with the assistance of the division's infantry. Beginning at 0100hrs on 12 September 1918, the 320th participated in a four-hour preparation, consisting of counter-battery fires on 16 German batteries and other positions. After the offensive started, the regiment also fired on "fugitive targets". On 13 September, the 320th and its sister 321st Field Artillery fired 10000 rounds in support of a raid by the 327th Infantry in the Bois Frehaut. The result of the St. Mihiel operation was "the establishment of confidence, born of performance" throughout the 157th Brigade.
After relief on 20 September and assembling near Marbache, the 320th spent the nights of 22–25 September moving to Beauzee, arriving on the morning of 26 September. On 26 September, the regiment moved to bivouac's near Futeau in the Argonne Forest, remaining there until 5 October.
At 1300 hours on 5 October 1918, the 157th received orders for an attack at 0500 hours the next morning. The advanced party established a regimental command post at Chaudron Farm, with the 321st Field Artillery's command post. Poor roads and miscommunications delayed the movement of the regiment's main body, and the first battery began firing at 0540 hours, 40 minutes after H-hour and the regiment missed the first planned phase of its plan.
After the truncated preparation, the regiment fired in support of the infantry throughout the day. At 1800 hours, the 2nd Battalion joined the 321st Field Artillery in repelling a German counterattack against the 164th Infantry Brigade. Defensive and harassing fire continued through the night of 6–7 October.
7 October was spent in establishing observation posts and telephone communications in the new positions. On the morning of 8 October, 2/320th again joined the 321st Field Artillery in firing a rolling barrage for the infantry, while the 1/320th and the French 219th artillery fired a "standing barrage" to protect the right flank of the 327th Infantry. On 9 October, the 320th again joined the 321st in firing a rolling barrage for the 327th and 328th Infantries of the 164th Infantry Brigade.
After receiving new orders on 10 October, the regiment spent the night of 10–11 October occupying new positions in the ravine west of Exermont. Assigned to support the 164th Infantry Brigade, the regiment assigned one battalion to each of the brigade's two regiments as accompanying artillery. The 1/320th occupied near Fleville, but poor visibility inhibited the identification of targets. Little movement occurred through 13 October, although on the afternoon of 13 October, the regiment fired a defensive barrage to repulse a German counterattack. During the afternoon and evening, 2/320th moved forward to positions south of Sommerance, although Battery E was delayed by the counterattack. The regiment continued to fire harassing fire through the night.
On 14 October, the regiment participated in a rolling barrage in support of a general First Army attack on the Kriemhilde Stellung, and at about 1600 hours fired a 30-minute defensive barrage along the Ravin aux Pierres. During this attack, a forward gun under 2nd Lieutenant Edward Gunter destroyed two pillboxes. And on the afternoon of 14 October, 1/320 moved forward to the ravine between Fleville and Sommerance.
From midnight on 14–15 October, the regiment fired preparation fires for another attack against the Kriemhilde Stellung, and then transitioned to a rolling barrage at 0725 to support the infantry's attack at 0730 hours. On 16 October, the regiment continued to deliver preparation and rolling barrage, and the fired against a German counterattack at 1100 hours. In the afternoon, a German plan was downed by machine gun fire, with credit claimed by Battery C, 320th, as well as the batteries of 2/321st Field Artillery. On 17 October, Lieutenant Durrett was killed by German shell fire. After a lull in the fighting, the 1/320th was withdrawn to rearward positions on the night of 21–22 October, and conditions settled into "stabilized warfare" until 1 November, with light harassing schedules at night, and close liaison maintained with the infantry for on-call missions.
From 26 to 31 October, the regiment moved a gun from each battery forward to conduct adjustments in preparation for a new offensive, scheduled for 1 November. The rest of the batteries moved forward on the night of 30–31 October. participated in a three-stage preparation from 0330 hours. During the night of 1–2 November, the 320th (and the other battalions of the 157th Brigade) moved forward into a between the 319th and 320th Infantries, and suffered heavy artillery and machine gun fire while covering the gap with their battery anti-aircraft machine guns. On the morning of 2 November, the attack resumed at 0800 hours, and the 321st moved forward and established a regimental command post in the town of Imecourt. Due to poor roads which limited the availability of ammunition resupply, the 320th remained stationary to allow resupply to the 321st. On 3 November, the regiment moved to positions north of Sivry-lez-Buzancy. While moving forward again on 4 November, the Regimental Commander ordered 1st Battalion into action at about 1100 hours against machine gun positions that were delaying the infantry advance. At 1500 hours, the 2nd Battalion also emplaced, and at 1600 hours, the entire regiment delivered a rolling barrage in support of the 318th Infantry, delivering 2600 rounds during 80 minutes of firing. On the morning of 5 November, the 320th relieved the 321st and moved forward with both battalions in close support of the infantry. At 1100 hours, 2/320th occupied southwest of Beaumont and fired at machine gun positions near La Thibaudine Ferme and La Harnot Erie Ferme in support of the 317th Infantry, and later in the afternoon, Battery B occupied south of the Stonne-Beaumont Road and fired on the village of Yoncq. After nightfall, the regiment fired another 500 rounds at Yoncq. This was the last "considerable firing" done by the regiment before moving to Sivry-Imecourt-St. Juvin (8-9 November), Monblainvill-Apremont (10 November) and Les Islettes, where it received news of the armistice on 11 November. The entire 157th Brigade remained near Les Islettes until 18 November, and then moved to Ste. Menehould before rejoining the 82nd Division in the Tenth Training area.

=== Interwar period ===
The 320th Field Artillery arrived at the port of New York on 7 May 1919 on the troopship USS Kentuckian and was demobilized on 12 May 1919 at Camp Dix, New Jersey. Pursuant to the National Defense Act of 1920, it was reconstituted in the Organized Reserve on 24 June 1921, assigned to the 82nd Division, and allotted to the Fourth Corps Area. The regiment was initiated on 7 December 1921 with regimental headquarters at Columbia, South Carolina. Subordinate battalion headquarters were concurrently organized as follows: 1st Battalion at Greenville, South Carolina, and 2nd Battalion at Sumter, South Carolina. The regimental headquarters was relocated on 8 July 1927 to Spartanburg, South Carolina. The regiment conducted annual summer training with the 2nd Battalion, 16th Field Artillery Regiment at Fort Bragg, North Carolina, and also conducted Citizens' Military Training Camps at Fort Bragg some years as an alternate form of summer training. The primary ROTC "feeder" school for new Reserve lieutenants for the regiment was The Citadel in Charleston, South Carolina.

=== World War II ===
On 25 March 1942, the 320th Field Artillery was ordered into active military service with the rest of the 82nd Division. On 15 August 1942, the 320th was converted to a glider field artillery battalion (GFAB) when the 82nd converted to an airborne division. After training in the United States at Camp Claiborne, Louisiana, and Fort Bragg, North Carolina, the battalion departed the New York Port of Embarkation in late April 1943. Arriving in Casablanca, French Morocco in early May, the 320th staged with the 325th Glider Infantry Regiment (GIR) Combat Team at Marnia, Algieria, under the command of Lieutenant Colonel Paul Wright. The 320th remained with the 325th in reserve near Kairouan, Tunisia, during the fighting in Sicily.

=== Cold War to present ===
As part of the implementation of the pentomic organization, the 320th Artillery was reorganized as a parent regiment under the Combat Arms Regimental System (CARS) on 22 March 1957. The regiment was redesignated as the 320th Field Artillery in 1971, reorganized under the U.S. Army Regimental System (ARS) in 1986, and redesignated as the 320th Field Artillery Regiment in 2005. Under the CARS and ARS, elements of the regiment have continued to serve with various units.

Battery A, 320th Artillery served briefly as a battery in the 11th Airborne Division from 1957 to 1958 before inactivating. As 1st Battalion, 320th Artillery (Field Artillery after 1971), it served as a direct support battalion in the 82nd Airborne Division Artillery from 1962 to 1986, and was then reassigned to the 101st Airborne Division. In 2004, the battalion was assigned to the 2nd Brigade Combat Team, 101st Airborne Division.

Battery B, 320th Artillery also served with the 11th Airborne Division from 1957 to 1958. Redesignated as 2nd Battalion, 320th Artillery (Field Artillery after 1971), the battalion served with the 101st Airborne Division Artillery from 1962 to 2004, when it was reassigned to the 1st Brigade Combat Team, 101st Airborne Division. The battalion inactivated in 2015.

Battery C, 320th Artillery served with the 11th Airborne Division from 1957 to 1958, and with the 82nd Airborne Division from 1962 to 1964. Redesignated as 3rd Battalion, 320th Artillery, it again served briefly with the 82nd Airborne again from 1968 to 1969. Activated again in 1986, 3rd Battalion, 320th Field Artillery returned to the 101st Airborne Division Artillery until 2004, when it was reassigned to the 3rd Brigade Combat Team, 101st Airborne Division.

Battery D, 320th Artillery served in the 82nd Airborne Division from 1957 to 1964. Redesignated as Battery D, 320th Field Artillery, the battery served with the 193rd Infantry Brigade from 1986 to 1994. Reorganized and redesignated as 4th Battalion, 320th Field Artillery Regiment, the battalion served with the 4th Brigade Combat Team, 101st Airborne Division from 2004 to 2013.

Battery E, 320th Artillery also served in the 82nd Airborne Division from 1957 to 1964. Redesignated as Battery E, 320th Field Artillery, the battery served with the Berlin Brigade from 1986 to 1994.

=== Further Operational Service by Regimental Elements ===
The 1-320th deployed to Dominican Republic in 1965 during Operation Power Pack, and to Grenada in 1983 during Operation Urgent Fury with the 82nd Airborne Division. The battalion participated in Operations Desert Shield and Storm in 1990–1, and has deployed six times during the Global War on Terror: to Iraq from 2003 to 2004, 2005–6, and 2007–8; and to Afghanistan from 2010 to 2011, in 2012, and in 2014.

The 2-320th deployed to Vietnam with the 101st Airborne Division from 1965 to 1972, to Operations Desert Shield and Storm in 1990–1, and multiple deployments in the Global War on Terror.

The 3-320th deployed to Operations Desert Shield and Storm in 1990–1, and multiple deployments in the Global War on Terror.

The 4-320th participated in Operation Just Cause in 1990 as Battery D, 320th Field Artillery. It also deployed four times during the Global War on Terror, to Iraq from 2005 to 2006, and to Afghanistan from 2008 to 2009, 2010–11, and in 2013.

== Lineage ==
- Constituted 5 August 1917 in the National Army (USA) as the 320th Field Artillery and assigned to the 82d Division
- Organized 29 August 1917 at Camp Gordon, Georgia
- Demobilized 12 May 1919 at Camp Dix, New Jersey
- Reconstituted 24 June 1921 in the Organized Reserves as the 320th Field Artillery and assigned to the 82d Division (later redesignated as the 82d Airborne Division)
- Organized in December 1921 at Camp Jackson (Fort Jackson) Columbia, South Carolina
- Reorganized and redesignated 13 February 1942 as the 320th Field Artillery Battalion
- Ordered into active military service 25 March 1942 and reorganized at Camp Claiborne, Louisiana
- Reorganized and redesignated 15 August 1942 as the 320th Glider Field Artillery Battalion

(Organized Reserves redesignated 25 March 1948 as the Organized Reserve Corps)

- Withdrawn 15 November 1948 from the Organized Reserve Corps and allotted to the Regular Army
- Inactivated 15 December 1948 at Fort Bragg, North Carolina
- Relieved 14 December 1950 from assignment to the 82d Airborne Division
- Redesignated 1 August 1951 as the 320th Airborne Field Artillery Battalion and activated at Fort Benning, Georgia
- Reorganized and redesignated 22 March 1957 as the 320th Artillery, a parent regiment under the Combat Arms Regimental System
- Redesignated 1 September 1971 as the 320th Field Artillery
- Withdrawn 2 October 1986 from the Combat Arms Regimental System and reorganized under the United States Army Regimental System

=== Campaign participation credit ===
- World War I: St. Mihiel; Meuse-Argonne; Lorraine 1918
- World War II: Sicily; Naples-Foggia; Normandy (with arrowhead); Operation Market Garden; Rhineland (with arrowhead); Ardennes-Alsace; Central Europe
- Vietnam: Defense; Counteroffensive; Counteroffensive, Phase II; Counteroffensive, Phase III; Tet Counteroffensive; Counteroffensive, Phase IV; Counteroffensive, Phase V; Counteroffensive, Phase VI; Tet 69/Counteroffensive; Summer-Fall 1969; Winter-Spring 1970; Sanctuary Counteroffensive; Counteroffensive, Phase VII; Consolidation I; Consolidation II
- Armed Forces Expeditions: Dominican Republic; Grenada; Panama
- Southwest Asia: Defense of Saudi Arabia; Liberation and Defense of Kuwait
- War on Terror: (Additional campaigns to be determined)

=== Decorations ===
- Presidential Unit Citation (Army) for STE. MERE EGLISE
- Presidential Unit Citation (Army) for DAK TO
- Valorous Unit Award for TUY HOA
- Meritorious Unit Commendation (Army) for VIETNAM 1965-1966
- Army Superior Unit Award for 1993-1994 (E Bty, Berlin Brigade)
- French Croix de Guerre with Palm, World War II for STE. MERE EGLISE
- French Croix de Guerre with Palm, World War II for COTENTIN
- French Croix de Guerre, World War II, Fourragere
- Military Order of William (Degree of the Knight of the Fourth Class) for NIJMEGEN 1944
- Netherlands Orange Lanyard
- Belgian Fourragere 1940
  - Cited in the Order of the Day of the Belgian Army for action in the ARDENNES
  - Cited in the Order of the Day of the Belgian Army for action in BELGIUM AND GERMANY

== Heraldry ==
=== Distinctive unit insignia ===
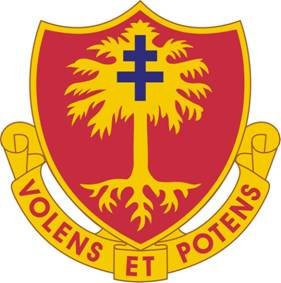

- Description

A Gold color metal and enamel device 1 1/8 inches (2.9 cm) in height overall consisting of a shield blazoned: Gules, on a palmetto tree eradicated Or a Lorraine cross Azure. Attached below and to the sides of the shield a Gold scroll inscribed "VOLENS ET POTENS" in Red letters.

- Symbolism

The shield is scarlet for Artillery; the palmetto tree, representing South Carolina, alludes to the district to which the unit was allocated. The Lorraine cross represents service in the Lorraine sector, France.

- Background

The distinctive unit insignia was originally approved for the 320th Field Artillery Regiment, Organized Reserves on 27 July 1925. It was redesignated for the 320th Field Artillery Battalion on 23 April 1942. It was redesignated for the 320th Glider Field Artillery Battalion on 22 October 1942. The insignia was redesignated for the 320th Airborne Field Artillery Battalion on 15 October 1951. It was redesignated for the 320th Artillery Regiment on 24 September 1958. Effective 1 September 1971, the insignia was redesignated for the 320th Field Artillery Regiment. The insignia was amended to update the description on 3 February 2005.

=== Coat of arms ===
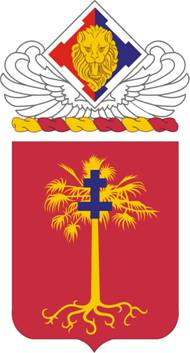

- Blazon
  - Shield:Gules, on a palmetto tree eradicated Or a Lorraine cross Azure.
  - Crest:On a wreath Or and Gules, issuing from two pairs of wings conjoined, elevated and addorsed Argent a lozenge of the like bearing a four-bastioned fort one bastion to chief parti per pale of the second and Azure charged with a lion's face Gold.
  - Motto:VOLENS ET POTENS (Willing and Able).
- Symbolism
  - Shield:The shield is scarlet for Artillery; the palmetto tree, representing South Carolina, alludes to the district to which the unit was allocated. The Lorraine cross represents service in the Lorraine sector, France.
  - Crest:The design of the crest commemorates three of the unit's especially noteworthy actions in World War II; i.e., the amphibious assault at Maori, Italy, the glider assault into Normandy, and participation in the Battle of the Bulge. The two pairs of wings from the arms of the Province of Salerno, where Maori is located, refer to that action. They also refer to the unit's service as a glider unit during World War II and its continued assignment to airborne organizations. The lion's face, alluding to the lion "gardant" in the arms of Normandy, stands for the assault into that province of France. The fort represents Bastogne and the white background the snow-covered terrain of the Battle of the Bulge. The red and blue vertical divisions of the fort is taken from the arms of Bastogne; the bastions overlooking four directions refer to its strategic location at the cross roads of major lines of communication. The red, white and blue color combination of the design also alludes to the unit's war service with the "All American" Division, the 82d Airborne.
- Background:The coat of arms was originally approved for the 320th Field Artillery Regiment, Organized Reserves on 27 July 1925. It was redesignated for the 320th Field Artillery Battalion on 23 April 1942. It was redesignated for the 320th Glider Field Artillery Battalion on 22 October 1942. The insignia was redesignated for the 320th Airborne Field Artillery Battalion and amended to delete the Organized Reserves' crest on 15 October 1951. It was redesignated for the 320th Artillery Regiment on 24 September 1958. It was amended to add a crest on 1 April 1965. Effective 1 September 1971, the insignia was redesignated for the 320th Field Artillery Regiment. It was amended to correct the colors of the wreath in the blazon of the crest on 8 November 1972. It was amended to correct the blazon of the crest on 3 February 2005.

== See also ==
- Field Artillery Branch (United States)
- Blazon
