= Air Assault Badge =

U.S. Army award

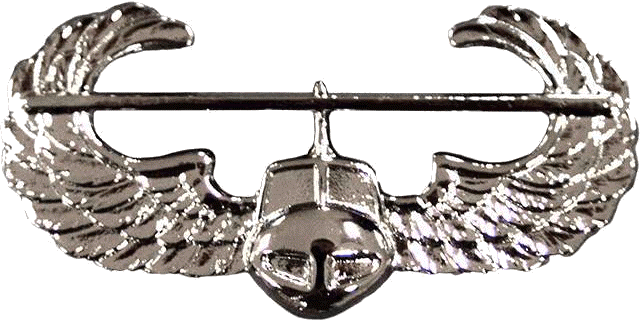
- Type: Special skills badge
- Awarded for: Air Assault training course
- Presented by: United States Army
- Status: Currently awarded
- Established: 1974

Precedence
- Next (higher): Pathfinder Badge
- Next (lower): Aviation Badges

The Air Assault Badge is awarded by the U.S. Army for successful completion of the Air Assault School. The course includes three phases of instruction involving U.S. Army rotary wing aircraft: combat air assault operations; rigging and slingloading operations; and rappelling from a helicopter.

According to the United States Army Institute of Heraldry, "The Air Assault Badge was approved by the Chief of Staff, Army, on 18 January 1978, for Army-wide wear by individuals who successfully completed Air Assault training after 1 April 1974. The badge had previously been approved as the Airmobile Badge authorized for local wear by the Commander of the 101st Airborne Division, effective 1 April 1974." The division had been reorganized from parachute to airmobile in mid-1968 in Vietnam and designated the 101st Airborne Division (Airmobile). The parenthetical designation changed to Air Assault on 4 October 1974 and the name of the badge was likewise changed.

== History ==
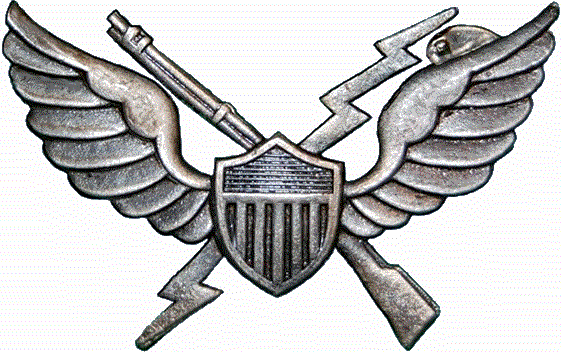
Original Air Assault Badge

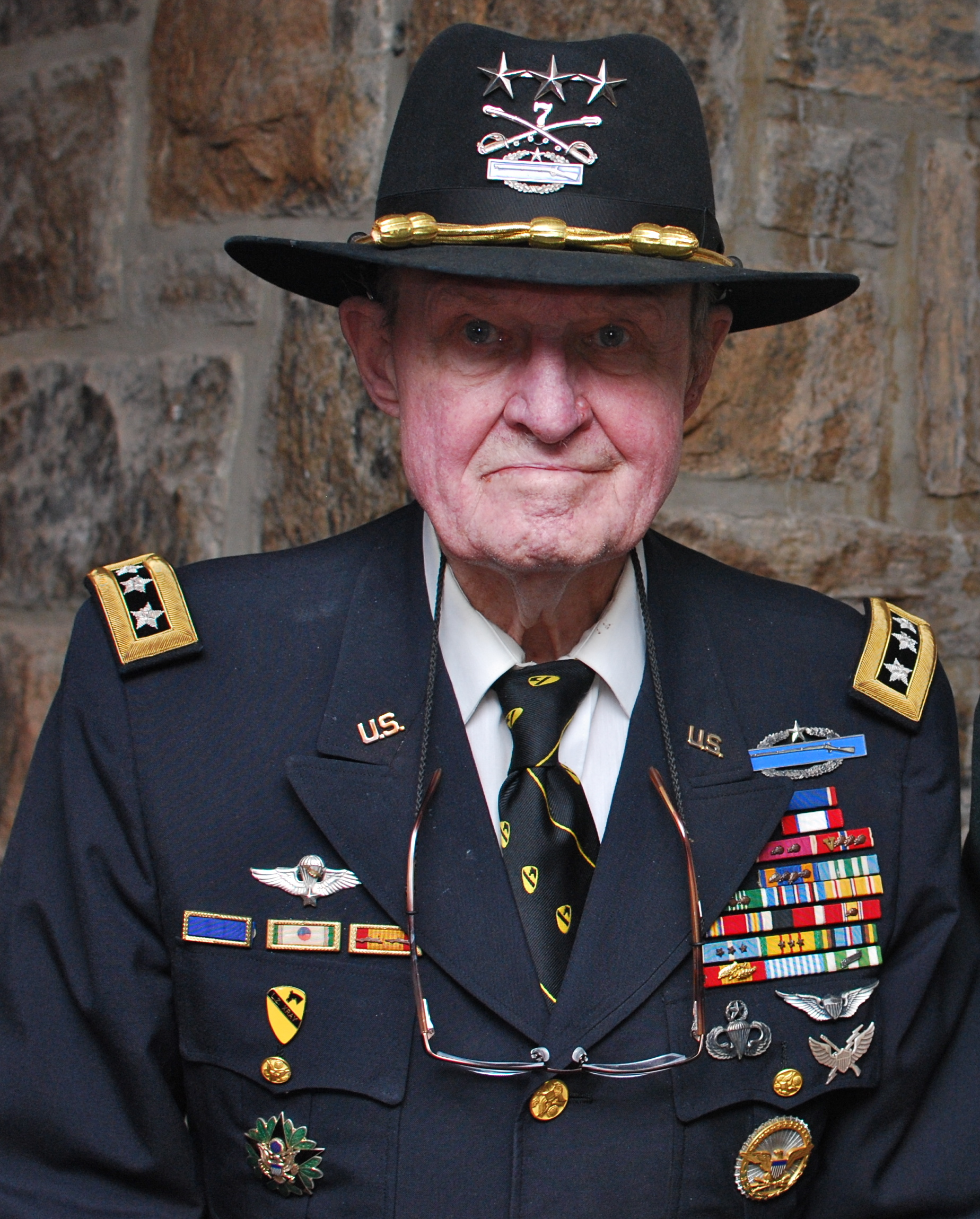
LTG (R) Hal Moore wearing the original Air Assault Badge

On 7 February 1963, the colors of the 11th Airborne Division were reactivated at Fort Benning, GA, as the 11th Air Assault Division (Test). The 11th was a small unit, never intended for deployable status, and used to test the airmobile concept then under development. Units of the 2d Infantry Division, also located at Fort Benning, were “borrowed” for large-scale airmobile tests and maneuvers.

An earlier Air Assault Badge, pictured on the right, was worn in the early 1960s by troops of 11th who qualified for it by making three helicopter rappels from 60 feet (18 m) and three from 120 feet (37 m). Soldiers were also required to be knowledgeable of aircraft safety procedures; familiar with aircraft orientation; proficient in hand and arm signals and combat assault operations; able to prepare, inspect and rig equipment for external sling loads; and able to lash down equipment inside helicopters. The badge was first awarded in early 1964 and was only authorized for wear by soldiers within the 11th, as it was a division award and not authorized for Army-wide wear by the Department of the Army.

On 30 June 1965 the 11th Air Assault Division was inactivated and its assets merged with the 2d Infantry Division to become the 1st Cavalry Division (Airmobile). The colors of the 2d Infantry Division were sent to Korea where the existing 1st Cavalry Division was reflagged as 2d Infantry Division and the colors of the 1st Cavalry Division sent to Fort Benning. Shortly thereafter the 1st Cavalry Division (Airmobile) was sent to Vietnam.

Maj. Jack R. Rickman is credited with the design of the Air Assault Badge when, in 1971, he was on tour with the 101st Airborne Division in Vietnam. He thought little of the outcome of the design assignment, given to him by a division operations officer, which the Army adopted officially in January 1978. He was made aware of his part in the badge design years later when he recognized his design work seen in a published photograph. He never earned a badge himself.

The design was influenced by the Parachutist Badge worn when the division was on jump status, as well as the Glider Badge worn by glider units during World War II. Charles Bloodworth, a pathfinder officer in the 101st during the early 1970s, wrote, "Locally designed and fabricated, the badge was deliberately crafted to mimic the glider wings of WWII. The nose of the Huey took the place of the glider body, and the horizontal rotor blade was the spitting image of the glider wing."

The 101st returned from Vietnam to Fort Campbell, Kentucky and the 173rd Airborne Brigade was inactivated with its assets transferred to form the division's 3rd Brigade, at the time was on jump status. The remainder of the division was organized as Airmobile. In February 1974, Major General Sidney B. Berry, Commanding General, signed Division General Order 179 authorizing the wearing of the Airmobile Badge effective 1 April 1974, the same date that the 3rd Brigade would terminate its jump status.

Bloodworth describes the transition of the post-war division to fully Air Assault and the adoption of the Air Assault Badge in his article titled, "History of the 101st (Post-Vietnam)."

== Training ==
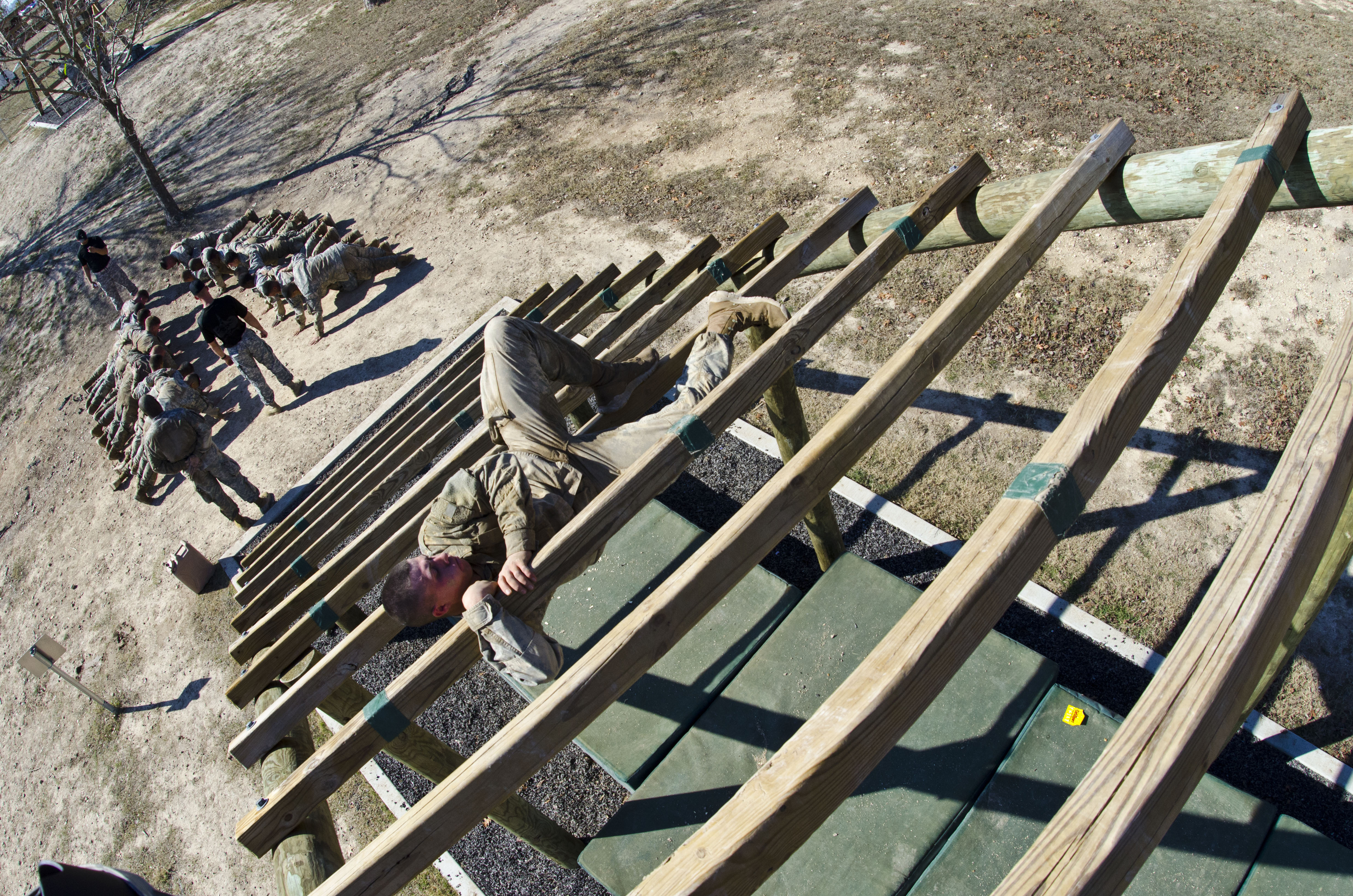
Student at Fort Hood traverse one of the obstacles during Day Zero.

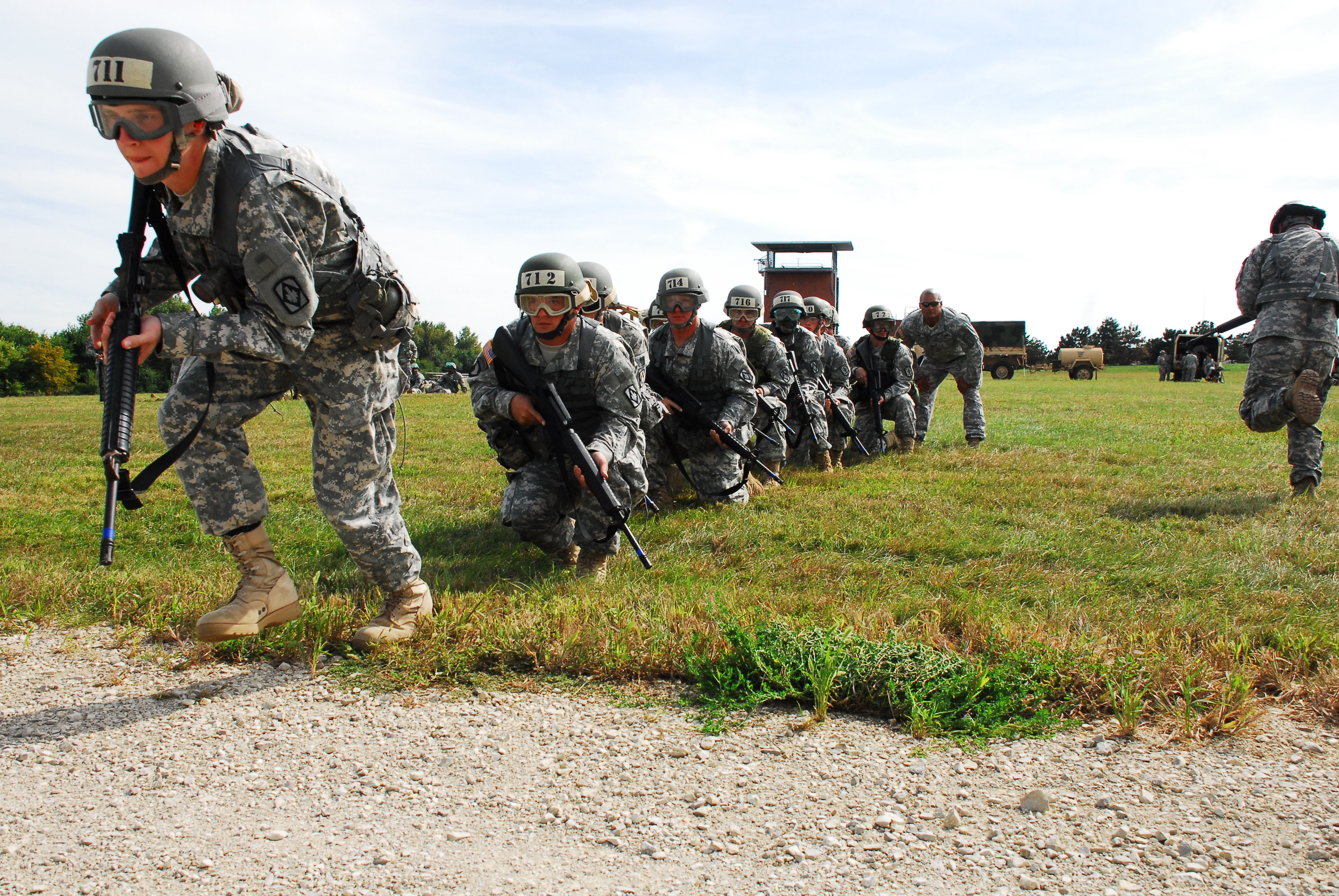
Students at Fort Riley rehearse maneuvers during Combat Assault Phase.

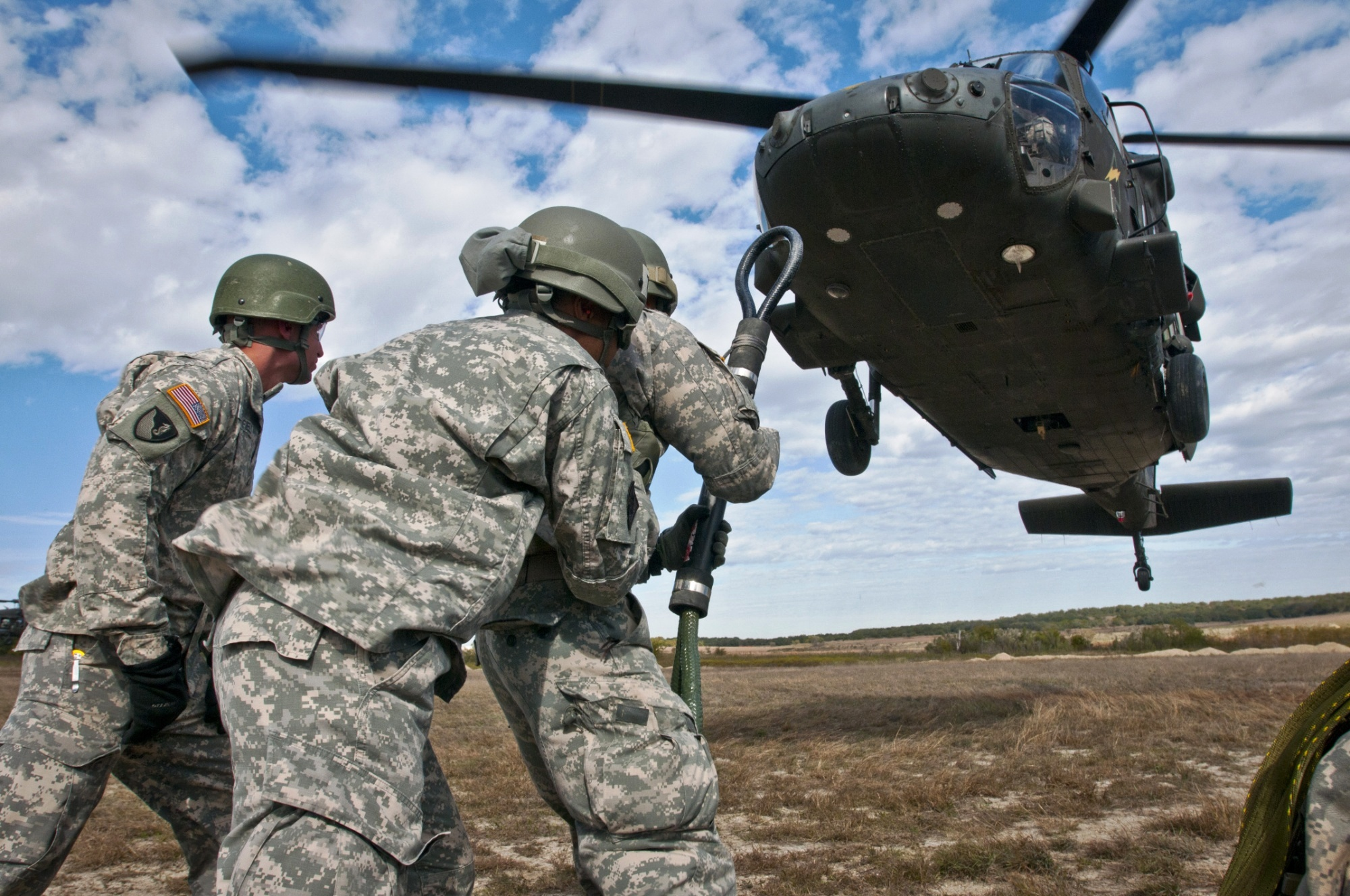
Students at Fort Hood brace against the propwash of a UH-60 Black Hawk as they prepare to attach a slingload during one of the course's practical exercises.

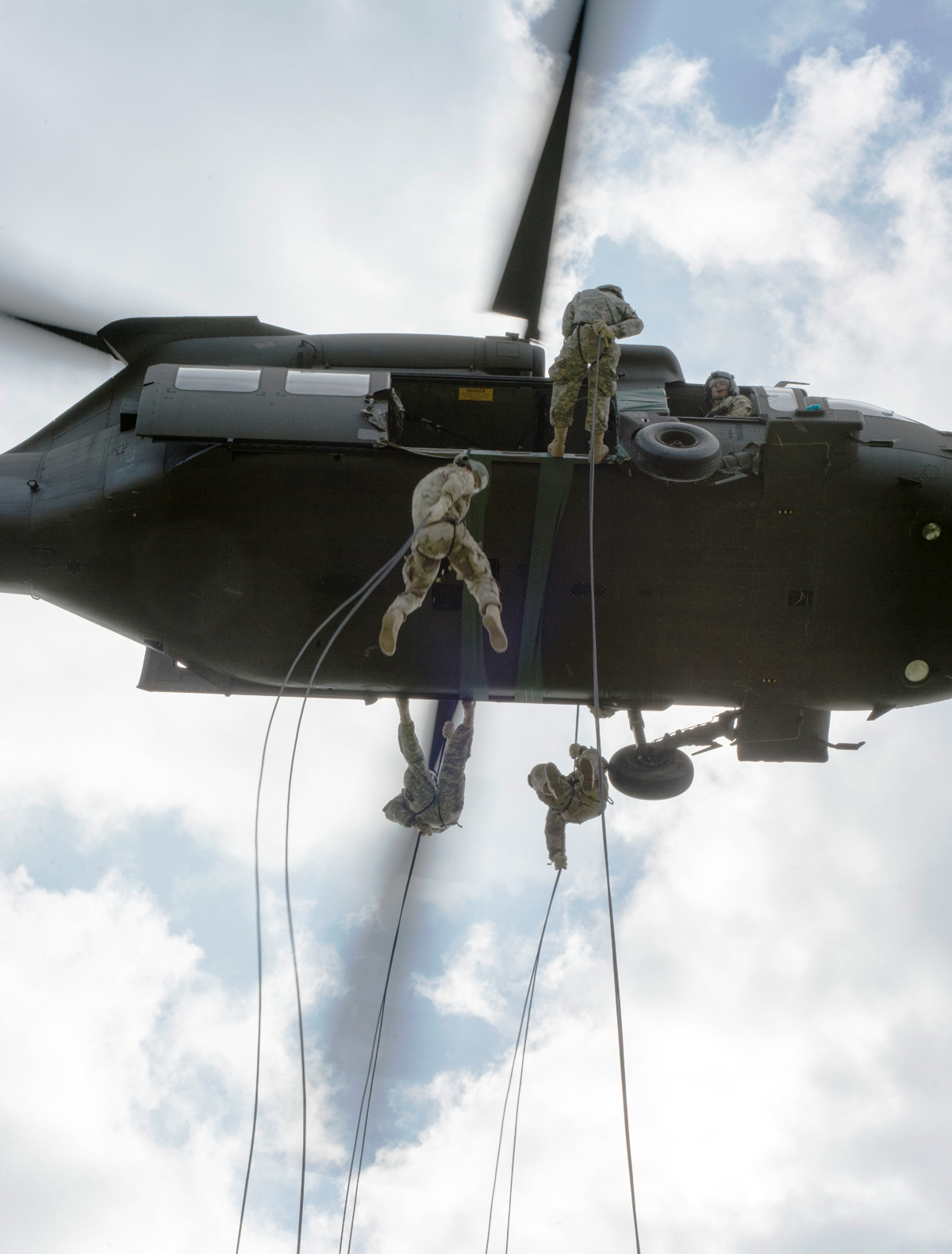
Students at Camp Gruber practice rappelling from a UH-60 Black Hawk.

Currently, in order for a US servicemember to be awarded the Air Assault Badge, they must first complete a 10 1/2-day course of instruction at the US Army Air Assault School. This course consists of the following phases of training:

- Day Zero: Candidates must successfully complete an obstacle course and a two-mile run before they are officially considered “Air Assault Students.”
- Day One: Candidates will undergo a six-mile march, followed by a strict inspection.
- Combat Assault Phase: During this three-day phase, candidates will learn aircraft safety and orientation, along with the principles of aero-medical evacuation, pathfinder operations, and combat assault operations among several other topics. Soldiers will be given a written and “hands-on” test following this phase.
- Slingload Operations: During the second three-day phase of Air Assault School, candidates will learn how to rig equipment onto rotary aircraft with a sling, an operation that generally requires the loading soldier to hook a tether to the underbelly of a helicopter hovering just a few feet above the ground. Typical loads can range anywhere from 1,000 to 8,000 pounds. Trainees must pass a written and hands-on test before moving to the next phase.
- Rappelling Phase: In the third and final three-day phase of Air Assault training, soldiers receive basic instruction on ground and aircraft rappelling procedures. By the end of the phase, trainees must complete two rappels from a 34-foot tower and two rappels from a UH-60, hovering at 70–90 feet.
- Graduation Day: Soldiers must complete a 12-mile foot march in full gear plus a rucksack in less than three hours. Graduates are awarded the Air Assault Badge and the "2B" Additional Skill Identifier (ASI) upon completion of the march.

=== Training locations ===
Formal air assault training has been conducted at Fort Campbell, Kentucky by the 101st Airborne Division (Air Assault) since the Air Assault School was formed in 1974. During the early stages of the occupation of Iraq in late 2003, the division conducted a course in-theater to maintain Air Assault proficiency.

Air Assault training is also offered by the Army National Guard (ARNG) Warrior Training Center at Fort Benning, which conducts training both at the post and at a variety of other locations throughout the United States by means of Mobile Training Teams.

A III Corps Air Assault School was announced for Fort Hood that was to start in June 2012.

The first class of the XVIII Airborne Corps Air Assault School at Fort Bragg, NC graduated on October 4, 2013 Due to funding and manpower issue, its closure was announced on May 10, 2019

Air assault training has also been conducted for varying periods of time at other locations, although many do not currently do so (2019):

- Camp Aachen, Grafenwöhr, Germany (WTC MTT conducted class for the 1st BCT, 3d Infantry Division during a six-month rotation)
- Camp Buehring, Kuwait (Cadre from the ARNG Warrior Training Center, first class conducted in April 2017)
- Camp Blanding, FL (FL ARNG; intermittent operations)
- Camp Carroll, Fort Richardson, AK (6th Infantry Division (Light), AK ARNG and 4th BCT (Abn), 25th Infantry Division)
- Camp Crowder, MO (MO ARNG hosting MTT, Feb - Mar 2012)
- Camp Edwards, MA (2017, MTT from the Warrior Training Center, Fort Benning, GA)
- Camp Gruber Maneuver Training Center, OK (OK ARNG) (1988–1994)
- Camp Rilea, OR (WTC MTT)
- Camp Smith, NY
- Camp Hovey, Korea (2001, hosted by the 2d Brigade, 2d Infantry Division); 25 February - 8 March 2013, 1st BCT, 2d Infantry Division hosting a MTT from the Warrior Training Center, Fort Benning, GA)
- Camp Mobile, Korea (2017, MTT from the Warrior Training Center, Fort Benning, GA)
- Camp Robertson, Schweinfurt, Germany (2005, hosted by the 2d Brigade, 1st Infantry Division; 2011, hosted by the 21st Theater Sustainment Command)
- Fort Belvoir, VA (Military District of Washington)
- Fort Benning, GA (ARNG Warrior Training Center) (Jan 2006–Present)
- Fort Bliss, TX (MTT, March 2011; quarterly courses conducted by the post's Iron Training Detachment); last class graduated in March 2019
- Fort Bragg, NC (XVIII Airborne Corps); on May 10, 2019 XVIII Airborne Corps announced it would shut down its Air Assault course due to "funding and the reduction of borrowed military manpower on Fort Bragg."
- Fort Carson, CO (4th Infantry Division/3rd Armored Cavalry Regiment via MTT hosted by 10th Special Forces Group)
- Fort Drum, NY (10th Mountain Division)
- Fort Hood (now Fort Cavazos), TX (Conducted by the LRRP Platoon, 2d Squadron, 1st Cavalry, 2d Armored Division in the mid-1980s. Rappelmaster certification courses were also offered; MTT in October 2011; III Corps AAS started in June 2012 and ended in February 2020)
- Fort Indiantown Gap, PA (MTT from the Warrior Training Center) (Starting annually in 2017)
- Fort Knox, KY
- Fort McCoy Total Force Training Center, WI (Light Fighter Academy)
- Fort Ord, CA (7th Infantry Division (Light))
- Fort Polk (now Fort Johnson), LA (near Warrior Brigade, 128th Combat Support Battalion)
- Fort Riley, KS (1st Infantry Division; MTT in September 2009)
- Fort Rucker (now Fort Novosel), AL (1st Aviation Brigade) (Nov 1983 - Oct 1995)
- Fort Pickett (now Fort Barfoot), VA (MTT)
- Fort Wainwright, Alaska (6th Infantry Division (Light)(Arctic))
- Fulda, Germany (11th Armored Cavalry Regiment)
- Schofield Barracks, HI (25th Infantry Division)
- U.S. Military Academy, West Point, New York (MTT, June 2017)

== Wearing of the badge ==
=== Army wear ===
Examples of wear of the Air Assault Badge on the U.S. Army Service Uniform
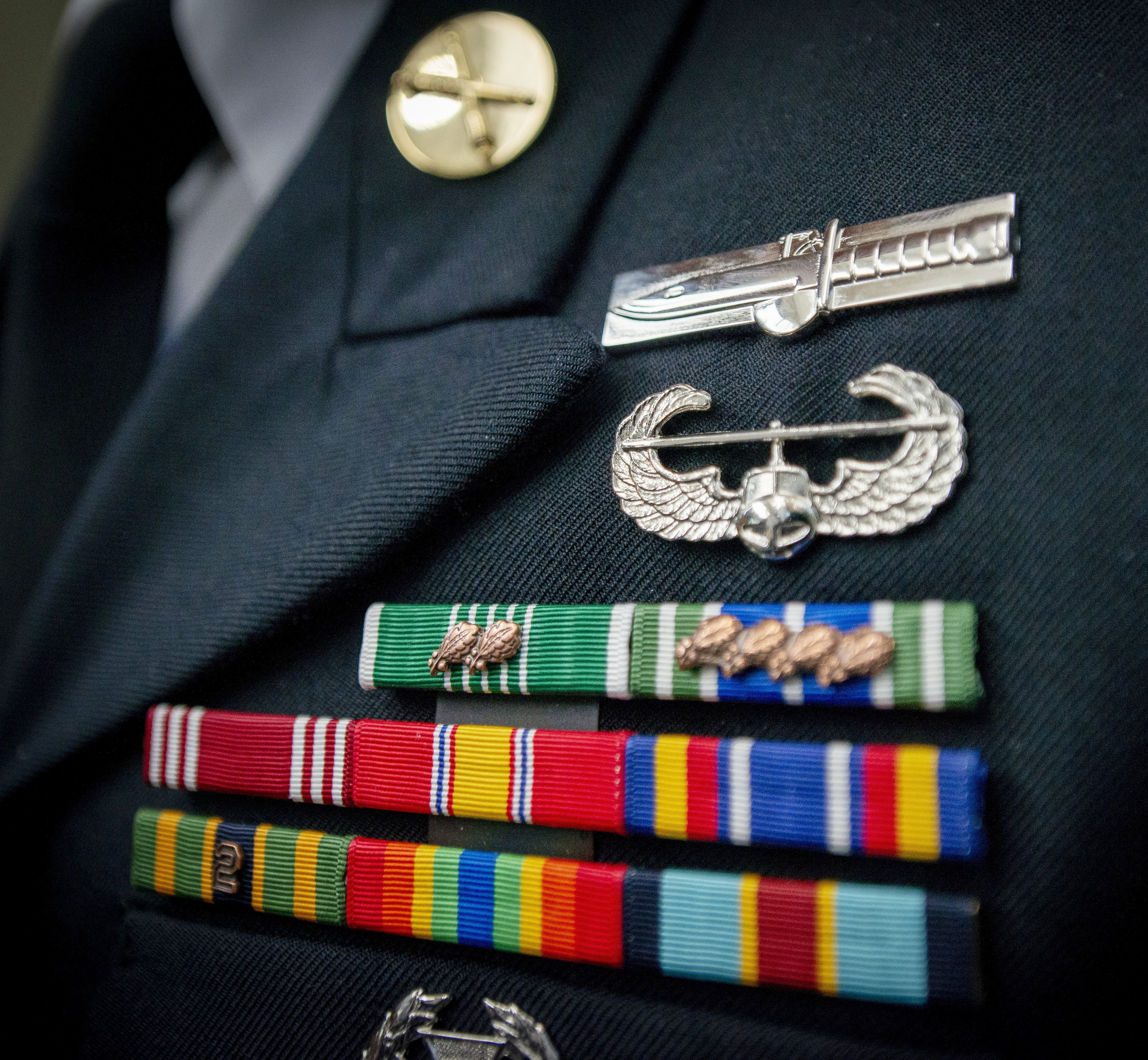
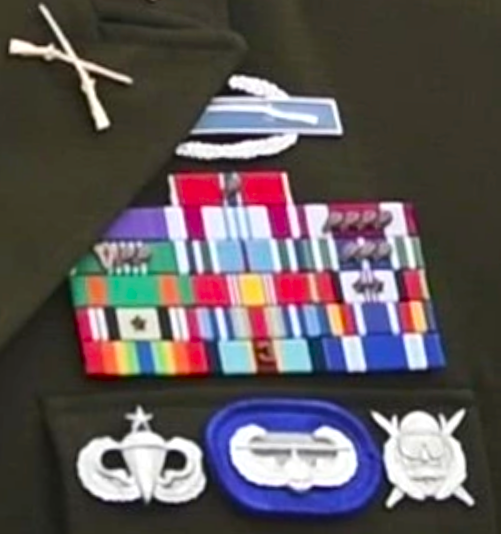

The wearing of the Air Assault Badge on Army uniforms is governed by Department of the Army Pamphlet (DA PAM) 670-1, "Guide to the Wear and Appearance of Army Uniforms and Insignia." Under this DA PAM, the Air Assault Badge is defined as a Group 4 precedence special skill badge which governs its wear in relation to other combat and special skill badges and tabs. The basic eligibility criteria for the badge consist of satisfactory completion of an air assault training course in accordance with the U.S. Army Training and Doctrine Command's standardized Air Assault Core Program of Instruction or completion of a standard Air Assault Course while assigned or attached to the 101st Airborne Division since 1 April 1974.

To be awarded an honorary Air Assault Badge, veterans must have been assigned or attached to the 101st Airborne Division, 101st Air Cavalry Division, 101st Airborne Division (Airmobile), or 1st Cavalry Division during the period from 1965 through 1972, while serving in combat in a combat arms or combat support specialty in Vietnam.

==== Airborne background trimming ====
When the 101st Airborne Division was converted to air assault, it carried over the wear of the cloth airborne background trimmings (ovals) from its time as an active airborne unit. According to Army Regulation 670-1, airborne background trimmings are authorized for organizations designated (by structure, equipment and mission) "Airborne" or "Air Assault" by Headquarters, Department of the Army. The following are airborne background trimmings currently authorized for wear behind the Air Assault Badge:

101st Airborne Division

101st Airborne Division, 1st Mobile Brigade Combat Team

101st Airborne Division, 2nd Mobile Brigade Combat Team

101st Airborne Division, 3rd Mobile Brigade Combat Team

101st Airborne Division Artillery

101st Airborne Division Sustainment Brigade

101st Aviation Regiment

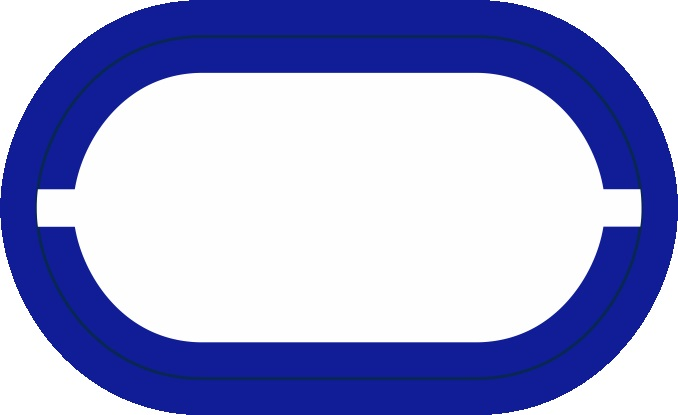
1st Battalion, 26th Infantry Regiment

1st Battalion, 187th Infantry Regiment

3rd Battalion, 187th Infantry Regiment

1st Battalion, 327th Infantry Regiment

2nd Battalion, 327th Infantry Regiment

1st Battalion, 502nd Infantry Regiment

2nd Battalion, 502nd Infantry Regiment

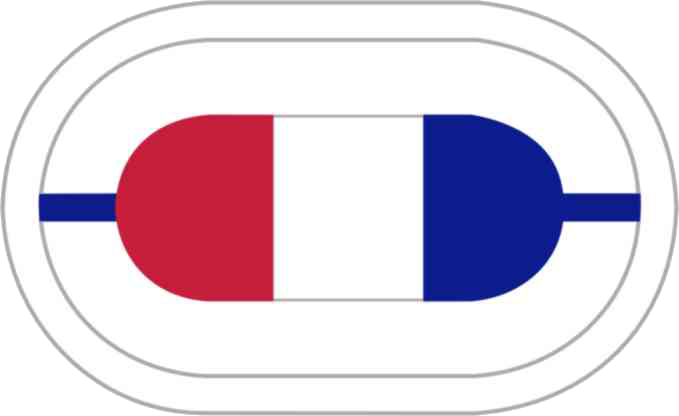
1st Battalion, 506th Infantry Regiment

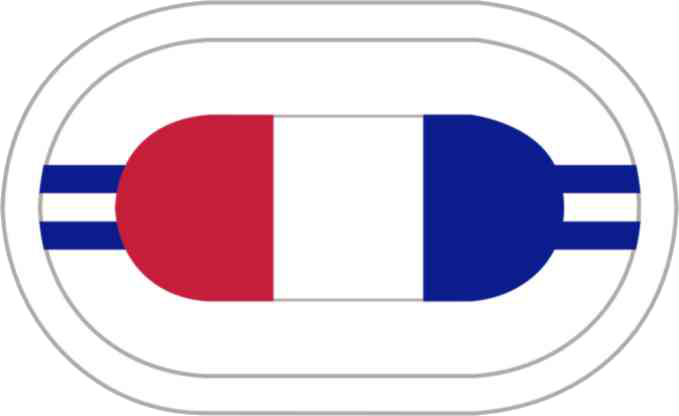
2nd Battalion, 506th Infantry Regiment

1st Battalion, 320th Field Artillery Regiment

2nd Battalion, 32nd Field Artillery Regiment

3rd Battalion, 320th Field Artillery Regiment

2nd Battalion, 44th Air Defense Artillery Regiment

501st Division Signal Battalion

326th Division Engineer Battalion

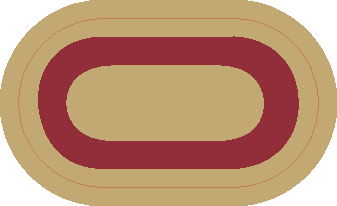
426th Light Support Battalion

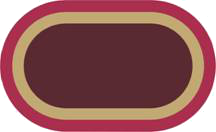
526th Light Support Battalion

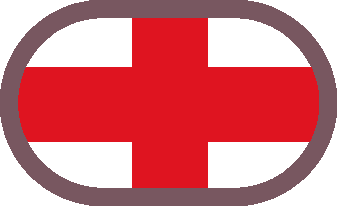
626th Light Support Battalion

Background trimmings have been denied by the US Army's Institute of Heraldry to other units with a parenthetical designation of “Air Assault” such as the California Army National Guard's 1st Battalion, 184th Infantry Regiment. The rationale given by The Institute of Heraldry was that units outside of the 101st Airborne Division did not have an "air assault mission." The reason various ARNG units were organized according to the Air Assault Modified Table of Organization and Equipment (MTOE) was because such units were authorized fewer personnel and less equipment, thus making them less expensive to operate and maintain. They were not organized with actual air assault missions in mind.

=== Department of the Air Force wear ===
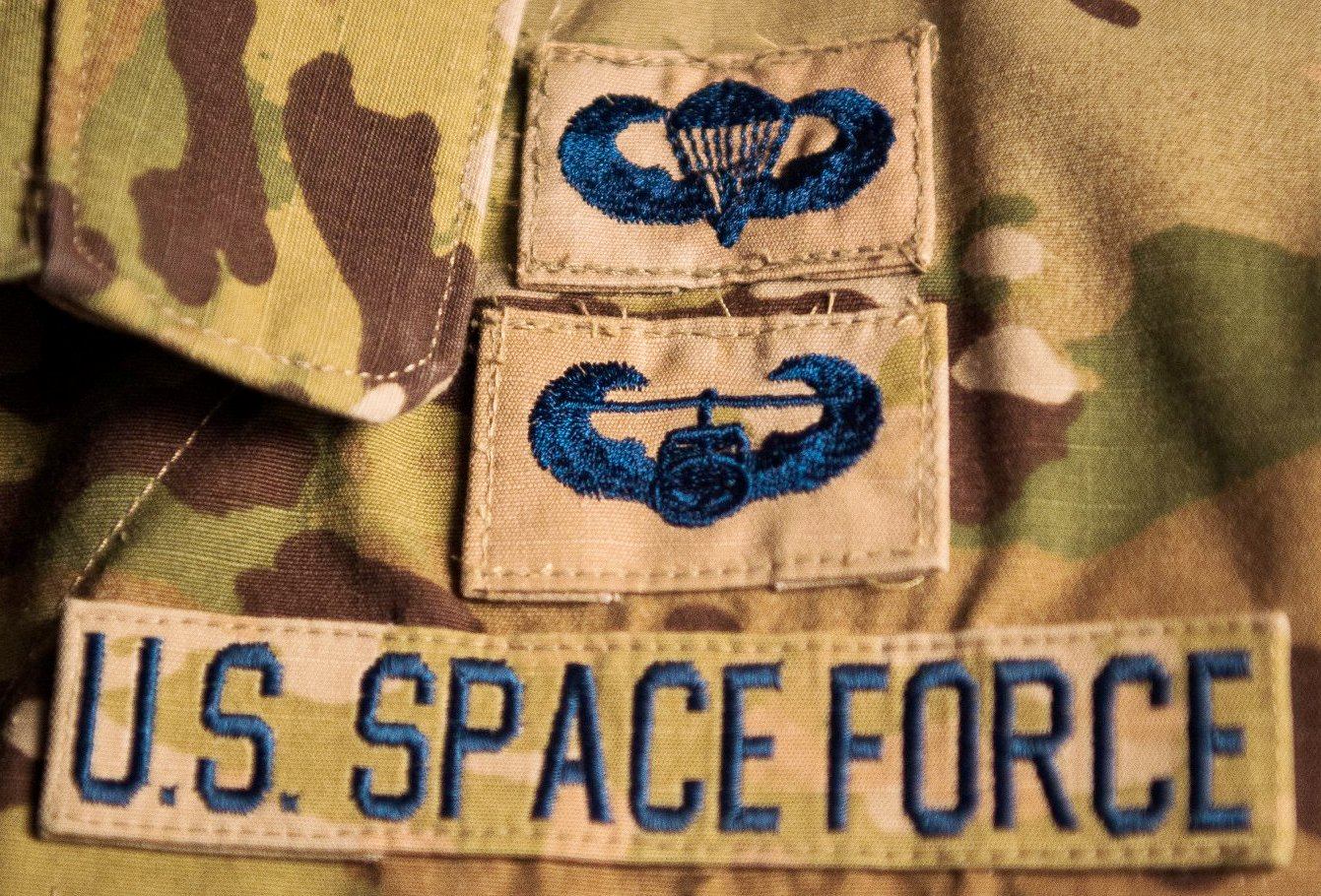
Example of U.S. Space Force wear of the Air Assault Badge on the Operational Camouflage Pattern uniform

All of the military services can send personnel to the U.S. Army's Air Assault Schools, but only the U.S. Army, U.S. Air Force, and U.S. Space Force allows for the Air Assault Badge to be worn on their uniforms. For several decades only U.S. Air Force personnel attached to the 101st Airborne Division were allowed to wear the badge and only while assigned, paralleling U.S. Army policy from 1974 to 1978 for Army soldiers. However, as of the 17 January 2014 update to uniform instructions, Department of Air Force personnel are authorized to wear the Air Assault Badge along with other special skill badges they have earned through other uniformed services.

=== Maritime services wear ===
The Air Assault Badge is not authorized for wear on uniforms of the U.S. Navy or U.S. Marine Corps. With the proper documentation filed in a unit's administrative department, prior U.S. Army service members who have enlisted or commissioned in the U.S. Coast Guard may wear the Air Assault Badge.

=== Canadian Armed Forces wear ===
The Air Assault badge is one of a number of foreign badges authorized to be worn on Canadian Armed Forces uniform.
