= 907th Glider Field Artillery Battalion =

The 907th Glider Field Artillery Battalion (907th GFAB), also designated as the 907th Field Artillery Battalion and as the 907th Airborne Field Artillery Battalion, is an inactive field artillery unit of the United States Army. The battalion served in three campaigns with the 82nd Division during World War I; with the 101st Airborne Division during World War II, seeing action in four campaigns, including the Invasion of Normandy, Operation Market Garden and the Battle of the Bulge. After a brief service in the Organized Reserve from 1948 to 1950, the battalion returned to active duty and the 101st Airborne Division briefly from 1956 to 1957, before its final inactivation.

== Lineage and honors ==
=== Lineage ===
- Constituted 5 August 1917 in the National Army as the 307th Ammunition Train and assigned to the 82nd Division.
- Organized October 1917 at Camp Gordon, Georgia.
- Demobilized 18–23 May 1919 at Camp Upton, New York.
- Reconstituted 24 June 1921 in the Organized Reserves and assigned to the 82nd Division.
- Organized January 1922 at Newberry, South Carolina.
- Redesignated 30 January 1942 as the 907th Field Artillery Battalion.
- Ordered into active military service, less personnel, and organized at Camp Claiborne, Louisiana, 25 March 1942.
- Reorganized and redesignated as the 907th Glider Field Artillery Battalion and assigned to the 101st Airborne Division, 15 August 1942.
- Inactivated 30 November 1945 in Germany.
- Relieved from the 101st Airborne Division, 18 June 1948.
- Redesignated 907th Field Artillery Battalion and assigned to Third Army, 5 October 1948.
- Activated 19 October 1948 at Jacksonville, Florida.
- Inactivated 31 December 1950 at Jacksonville, Florida.

(Organized Reserve Corps redesignated Army Reserve, 9 July 1952.)

- Withdrawn from the Army Reserve, redesignated 907th Airborne Field Artillery Battalion, allotted to the Regular Army and assigned to the 101st Airborne Division, 4 June 1956.
- Activated 1 July 1956 at Fort Campbell, Kentucky.
- Inactivated 25 April 1957 at Fort Campbell.

=== Campaign participation credit ===
- World War I: St. Mihiel; Meuse-Argonne; Lorraine 1918
- World War II: Normandy (with arrowhead); Rhineland (with arrowhead); Ardennes-Alsace; Central Europe

=== Decorations ===
- Presidential Unit Citation (Army), Streamer embroidered BASTOGNE
- French Croix de Guerre with Palm, World War II, Streamer embroidered NORMANDY
- Belgian Fourragere 1940
  - Cited in the Order of the Day of the Belgian Army for the defense of BASTOGNE
  - Cited in the Order of the Day of the Belgian Army for action in FRANCE AND BELGIUM
- Netherlands Orange Lanyard

== Heraldry ==
=== Distinctive unit insignia ===
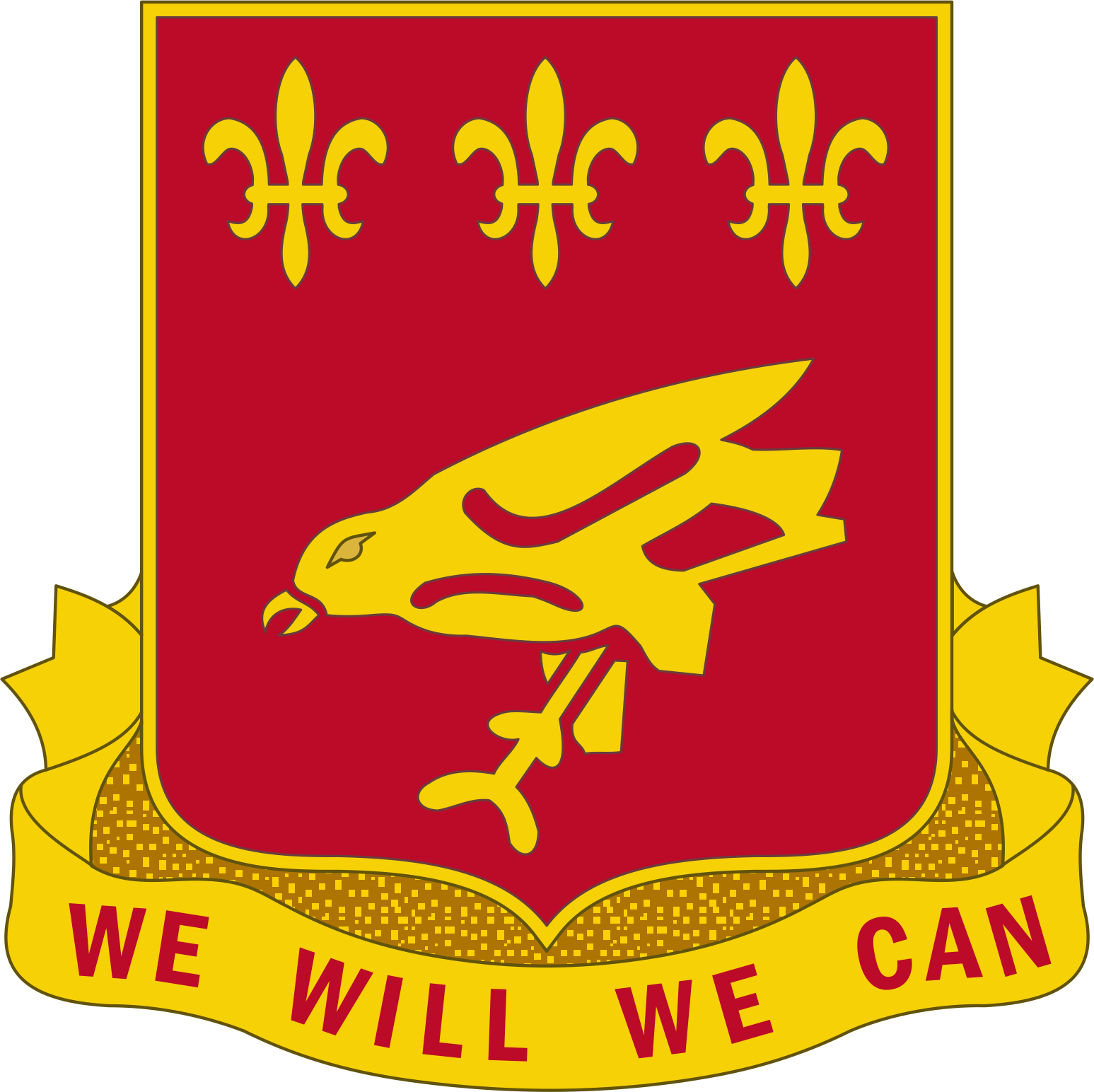

- Description/Blazon: A Gold color metal and enamel device 1 1/8 inches (2.86 cm) in height overall consisting of a shield blazoned: Gules a falcon striking bendsinisterwise, in chief three fleurs-de-lis fess Or. Attached below and to the sides of the shield a Gold scroll inscribed "WE WILL WE CAN" in Red letters.
- Symbolism: The scarlet of the shield is for the Field Artillery. The falcon is symbolic of the airborne functions of the battalion; being one of the most powerful birds, it signifies one eager pursuit of prey. The three gold fleurs-de-lis are representative of the battle honors earned in France in World War I. The motto "We Will, We Can" is self-explanatory, being expressive of the determination of the personnel to achieve all objectives.
- Background: The distinctive unit insignia was originally approved for the 907th Glider Field Artillery Battalion on 14 November 1942. It was redesignated for the 907th Airborne Field Artillery Battalion on 31 July 1956.

=== Coat of arms ===
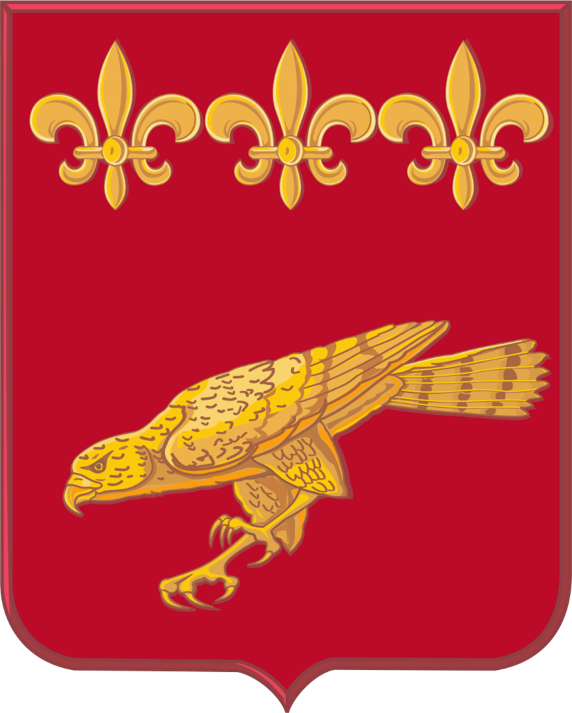

- Description/Blazon
  - Shield: Gules a falcon striking bendsinisterwise, in chief three fleurs-de-lis fess Or.
  - Crest: None.
  - Motto: WE WILL, WE CAN.
- Symbolism
  - Shield: The scarlet of the shield is for the Field Artillery. The falcon is symbolic of the airborne functions of the battalion; being one of the most powerful birds, it signifies one eager pursuit of prey. The three gold fleurs-de-lis are representative of the battle honors earned in France in World War I.
  - Crest: None.
  - Background: The coat of arms was originally approved for the 907th Glider Field Artillery Battalion on 14 November 1942. It was redesignated for the 907th Airborne Field Artillery Battalion on 31 July 1956.
