= U.S. Army Combat Arms Regimental System =

Former United States Army organization system

The Combat Arms Regimental System (CARS), was the method of assigning unit designations to units of some of the combat arms branches of the United States Army, including Infantry, Special Forces, Field Artillery, and Armor, from 1957 to 1981. Air Defense Artillery was added in 1968.

CARS was superseded by the U.S. Army Regimental System (USARS) in 1981, although the term "Regiment" was never appended to the official name or designation of CARS regiments, and was not added to USARS regiments until 2005.

== History ==
Before the adoption of CARS, there was no satisfactory means of maintaining the active life of the combat arms organizations. Whenever the nation entered periods of military retrenchment, units were invariably broken up, reorganized, consolidated, or disbanded. During periods of mobilization, large numbers of new units were created. Changes in weapons and techniques of warfare produced new types of units to replace the old ones. As a result, soldiers frequently served in organizations with little or no history, while units with long combat records remained inactive.

In the late 1950s requirements for maneuverable and flexible major tactical organizations demanded highly mobile divisions with greatly increased firepower. For this purpose the regiment was deemed too large and unwieldy and had to be broken up into smaller organizations. (Most artillery and armored regiments had already been broken up for flexibility and maneuverability during World War II.)

When the U.S. Army division was reorganized under the Pentomic structure in 1957, the traditional regimental organization was eliminated, raising questions as to what the new units were to be called, how they were to be numbered, and what their relationship to former organizations was to be.

On 24 January 1957 the secretary of the Army approved the CARS concept, as devised by the Deputy Chief of Staff for Personnel, which was designed to provide a flexible regimental structure that would permit perpetuation of unit history and tradition in the new tactical organization of divisions, without restricting the organizational trends of the future.

== Units that participated in CARS ==
- There were 61 Regular Army infantry regiments and 18 Army Reserve infantry regiments, plus the 1st Special Forces, in the Combat Arms Regimental System.
- There were 30 Regular Army armor/cavalry regiments in the Combat Arms Regimental System. The only Regular Army combat units not organized under CARS were the 2nd, 3rd, 6th, 11th, and 14th Armored Cavalry Regiments.
- There were 82 Regular Army artillery regiments in the Combat Arms Regimental System – 58 field artillery regiments and 24 air defense artillery regiments.
- Except for the 18 Army Reserve infantry regiments, those regiments organized under CARS had elements in both the Regular Army and the Army Reserve. In the Army National Guard, each state has its own regiments. The number of CARS regiments varied as troop allotments change. The 1st Special Forces has elements in all three components – Regular Army, Army Reserve and Army National Guard.

The criteria for the majority of the regiments selected were two factors: age (one point for each year since original organization) and honors (two points for each campaign and American decoration). Those regiments with the most points were selected for inclusion in the system.

== CARS implementation phases ==
- Phase I: Reorganization of Regular Army regiments (1957)
- Phase II: Reorganization of Army Reserve regiments (1959)
- Phase III: Reorganization of Army National Guard regiments (1959)
- Phase IV: Mobilization planning (1957–present)
- Phase V: Organization of regimental headquarters (subsequently suspended indefinitely)

== Organization ==
Each company, battery or troop in the regiment (as originally organized) was reorganized as the headquarters and headquarters element of a new battle group, battalion, or squadron in the new regiment. The new battle group, battalion, or squadron's organic elements (lettered elements, such as "Company A") were constituted and activated as new units. Each of the old companies, batteries, or troops of the former regiment also had the capability of becoming a separate company, battery, or troop in the new regiment. The regimental headquarters was transferred to Department of the Army control. (For detailed charts of typical regiments reorganized under CARS, see below Illustrations of organization under CARS)

The lowest numbered or lettered active element of the regiment normally has custody of the regimental properties. If, however, the lowest numbered or lettered active element is unable to care for the properties, they may be transferred to the next lowest numbered or lettered active element. If a numbered or lettered element of the regiment is activated lower than the one having custody of the regimental properties, the properties will not necessarily be transferred.

== Difference between a brigade and a regiment ==
In a regiment not organized under CARS, there is a fixed number of organic elements organized into battalions or squadrons. For example, the infantry regiment of World War II contained twelve companies A through M (minus J – not used) divided into three battalions (of four companies each), plus supporting elements such as the service company.

A brigade, on the other hand, is a flexible organization; it has no permanent elements. A brigade may have several different kinds of units assigned to it, such as: three light infantry battalions or two mechanized infantry and an armor battalion or one light, one mechanized and one armor battalion; plus support units. The usual number of maneuver battalions was three; however, this was a guideline not a rule (ex: the 173rd Airborne Brigade in Vietnam had four airborne infantry battalions).

In tactical structure, therefore, it is very similar to the Regimental Combat Team of World War II and Korean War. Its maneuver (infantry and armor) elements were not required to be from the same regiment. Since they were flexible, except for the headquarters and headquarters company, no two brigades need be alike, whereas all regiments were fixed with organic elements provided for under basic tables of organization and equipment.

== Battle honors ==
Each battalion or squadron of a CARS regiment has a replica of the regimental colors with the number of the battalion or squadron in the upper fly. The streamers attached to the colors were those for the regiment, as determined when the regiment was reorganized under CARS, plus those subsequently earned by the battalion or squadron.

Those campaigns and decorations actually earned by the battalion or squadron were shown on the streamers by earned honor devices. Regimental honors were listed on the battalion or squadron Lineage and Honors Certificates, with the earned honors being marked by asterisks.

Separate batteries, troops, and companies of CARS regiments display only those honors they actually earned, not the regimental ones. Campaign participation credit for these guidon-bearing units are displayed by silver bands and decorations streamers. (See ARs 672-5-1, 840-10 and 870-5 for further details.) Personnel wear the distinctive insignia for their regiment and the shoulder sleeve insignia of their division or other tactical organization to which they were assigned. (See AR 670-5 for further details.) The Adjutant General controls the designations of elements to be activated and coordinates his selections with the Center of Military History.

== Regiments organized under Combat Arms Regimental System ==
=== Armor ===
- 13th Armor
- 32nd Armor
- 33rd Armor
- 34th Armor
- 35th Armor
- 37th Armor
- 40th Armor
- 63rd Armor
- 64th Armor
- 66th Armor
- 67th Armor
- 68th Armor
- 69th Armor
- 70th Armor
- 72nd Armor
- 73rd Armor
- 77th Armor
- 81st Armor

=== Air Defense Artillery ===
- 1st Air Defense Artillery
- 2nd Air Defense Artillery
- 3rd Air Defense Artillery
- 4th Air Defense Artillery
- 5th Air Defense Artillery
- 6th Air Defense Artillery
- 7th Air Defense Artillery
- 38th Air Defense Artillery
- 43rd Air Defense Artillery
- 44th Air Defense Artillery
- 51st Air Defense Artillery
- 52nd Air Defense Artillery
- 55th Air Defense Artillery
- 56th Air Defense Artillery
- 57th Air Defense Artillery
- 59th Air Defense Artillery
- 60th Air Defense Artillery
- 61st Air Defense Artillery
- 62nd Air Defense Artillery
- 65th Air Defense Artillery
- 67th Air Defense Artillery
- 68th Air Defense Artillery
- 71st Air Defense Artillery
- 517th Air Defense Artillery
- 562nd Air Defense Artillery

=== Cavalry ===
- 1st Cavalry
- 4th Cavalry
- 5th Cavalry
- 6th Cavalry
- 7th Cavalry
- 8th Cavalry
- 9th Cavalry
- 10th Cavalry
- 12th Cavalry

=== Field Artillery ===
- 1st Field Artillery
- 2nd Field Artillery
- 3rd Field Artillery
- 4th Field Artillery
- 5th Field Artillery
- 6th Field Artillery
- 7th Field Artillery
- 8th Field Artillery
- 9th Field Artillery
- 10th Field Artillery
- 11th Field Artillery
- 12th Field Artillery
- 13th Field Artillery
- 14th Field Artillery
- 15th Field Artillery
- 16th Field Artillery
- 17th Field Artillery
- 18th Field Artillery
- 19th Field Artillery
- 20th Field Artillery
- 21st Field Artillery
- 22nd Field Artillery
- 25th Field Artillery
- 27th Field Artillery
- 29th Field Artillery
- 30th Field Artillery
- 31st Field Artillery
- 32nd Field Artillery
- 33rd Field Artillery
- 34th Field Artillery
- 35th Field Artillery
- 36th Field Artillery
- 37th Field Artillery
- 38th Field Artillery
- 39th Field Artillery
- 40th Field Artillery
- 41st Field Artillery
- 42nd Field Artillery
- 73rd Field Artillery
- 75th Field Artillery
- 76th Field Artillery
- 77th Field Artillery
- 78th Field Artillery
- 79th Field Artillery
- 80th Field Artillery
- 81st Field Artillery
- 82nd Field Artillery
- 83rd Field Artillery
- 84th Field Artillery
- 92nd Field Artillery
- 94th Field Artillery
- 103rd Field Artillery
- 201st Field Artillery
- 319th Field Artillery
- 320th Field Artillery
- 321st Field Artillery
- 333rd Field Artillery
- 377th Field Artillery

=== Infantry ===
Regular Army regiments

- 1st Infantry
- 2nd Infantry
- 3rd Infantry
- 4th Infantry
- 5th Infantry
- 6th Infantry
- 7th Infantry
- 8th Infantry
- 9th Infantry
- 10th Infantry
- 11th Infantry
- 12th Infantry
- 13th Infantry
- 14th Infantry
- 15th Infantry
- 16th Infantry
- 17th Infantry
- 18th Infantry
- 19th Infantry
- 20th Infantry
- 21st Infantry
- 22nd Infantry
- 23rd Infantry
- 26th Infantry
- 27th Infantry
- 28th Infantry
- 29th Infantry
- 30th Infantry
- 31st Infantry
- 32nd Infantry
- 33rd Infantry
- 34th Infantry
- 35th Infantry
- 36th Infantry
- 38th Infantry
- 39th Infantry
- 41st Infantry
- 46th Infantry
- 47th Infantry
- 48th Infantry
- 50th Infantry
- 51st Infantry
- 52nd Infantry
- 54th Infantry
- 58th Infantry
- 60th Infantry
- 61st Infantry
- 75th Ranger
- 87th Infantry
- 187th Infantry
- 188th Infantry
- 325th Infantry
- 327th Infantry
- 501st Infantry
- 502nd Infantry
- 503rd Infantry
- 504th Infantry
- 505th Infantry
- 506th Infantry
- 508th Infantry
- 509th Infantry
- 511th Infantry

Army Reserve regiments

- 59th Infantry
- 305th Infantry
- 306th Infantry
- 307th Infantry
- 314th Infantry
- 315th Infantry
- 322nd Infantry
- 345th Infantry
- 357th Infantry
- 358th Infantry
- 359th Infantry
- 381st Infantry
- 383rd Infantry
- 409th Infantry
- 410th Infantry
- 411th Infantry
- 442nd Infantry

Special Forces Regiment

- 1st Special Forces

== Illustrations of organization under CARS ==
=== Chart 1 – Typical Infantry Regiment under CARS ===
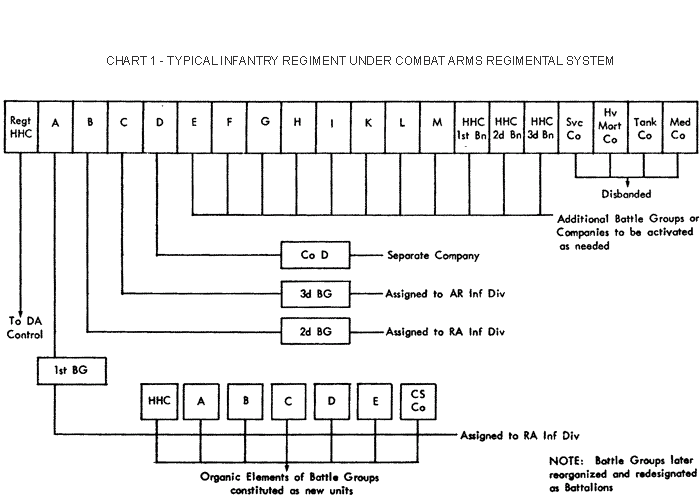

=== Chart 2 – Typical Armor/Cavalry Regiment under CARS ===
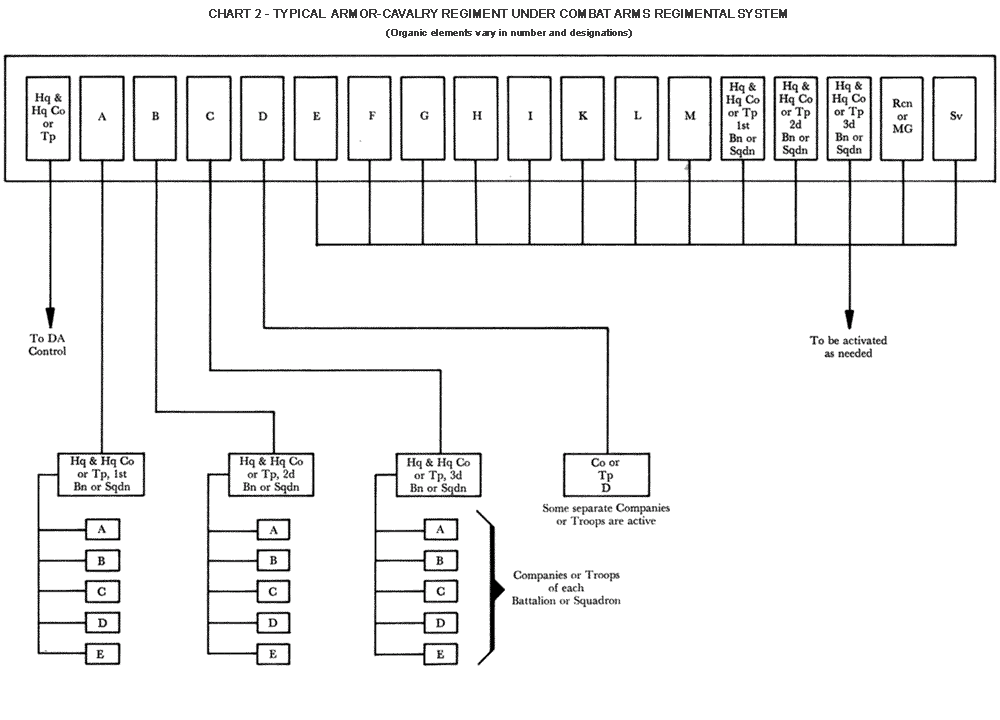

=== Chart 3 – Typical Field Artillery Regiment under CARS ===
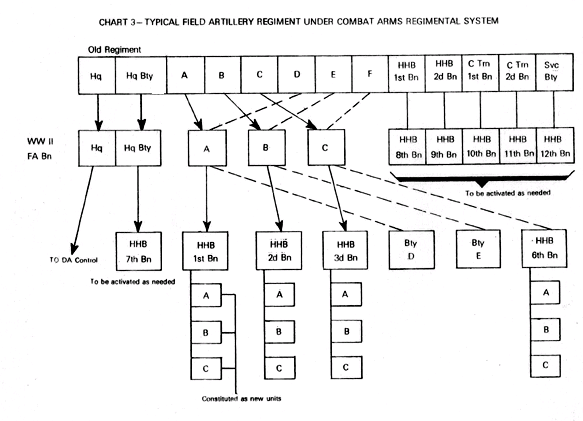

=== Chart 4 – Typical Air Defense Artillery Regiment under CARS ===
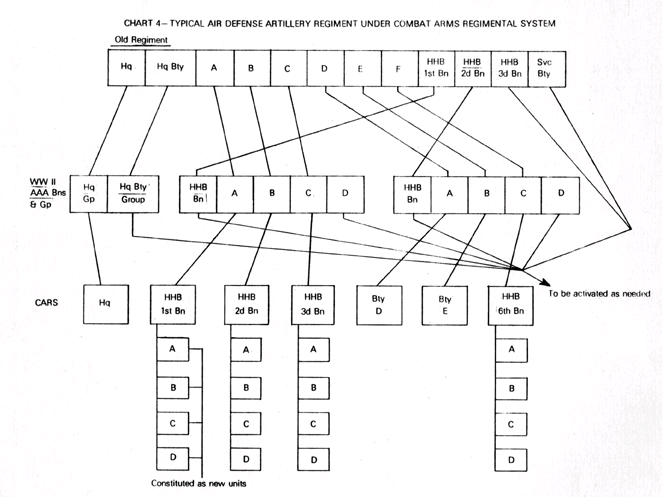

== General references ==
- John K. Mahon and Romana Danysh, CMH 60-3: Infantry, Part I: Regular Army, The Pentomic Concept and the Combat Arms Regimental System
- Department of the Army Regulations
