= 32nd Field Artillery Regiment =

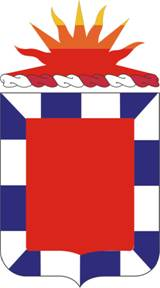
- Coat of arms
- Active: 1918
- Country: United States
- Branch: Army
- Type: Field artillery
- Motto: "Proud Americans"

Insignia
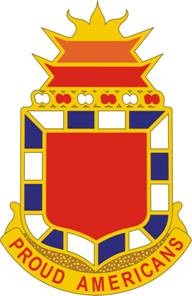
- Distinctive unit insignia

The 32nd Field Artillery Regiment is a distinguished and highly decorated field artillery regiment of the United States Army, first Constituted in 1918.

== Lineage ==
Constituted in the Regular Army as the 32nd Field Artillery and assigned to the 11th Infantry Division (United States) 5 July 1918.

== Distinctive unit insignia ==
- Description

A gold color metal and enamel device 1 3/16 inches 3.02 cm) in height consisting of the shield, crest and motto of the coat of arms.

- Symbolism

The shield is red for Artillery. The bordure is in the colors of the corps distinguishing flag to indicate Corps Artillery. The crest represents the West Coast, the present assignment of the regiment; and inasmuch as a demi-sun also has the appearance of a rising sun it may also represent the origin of the organization on the East Coast.

- Background

The distinctive unit insignia was originally approved for the 32nd Field Artillery, Regular Army Inactive on 9 July 1937. It was redesignated for the 32nd Field Artillery Battalion on 2 January 1941. It was amended to change the motto on 7 May 1941. It was redesignated for the 32nd Artillery Regiment on 30 April 1958. It was amended to correct the description on 18 June 1958. It was amended to correct the unit designation from Regiment to Battalion on 20 February 1959. It was redesignated for the 32nd Artillery Regiment on 24 July 1959. The insignia was redesignated effective 1 September 1971, for the 32d Field Artillery Regiment.

== Coat of arms ==
=== Blazon ===
- Shield

Gules, a bordure compony Argent and Azure.

- Crest

On a wreath of the colors Argent and Gules a demi-sun in splendor triparted barwise Or, Tenné and Gules. Motto PROUD AMERICANS.

- Symbolism
- Shield

The shield is red for Artillery. The bordure is in the colors of the corps distinguishing flag to indicate Corps Artillery. Crest The crest represents the West Coast, the present assignment of the regiment; and inasmuch as a demi-sun also has the appearance of a rising sun it may also represent the origin of the organization on the East Coast.

- Background

The coat of arms was originally approved for the 32nd Field Artillery, Regular Army Inactive on 9 July 1937. It was redesignated for the 32nd Field Artillery Battalion on 11 January 1941. It was amended to change the motto on 7 May 1941. It was redesignated for the 32nd Artillery Regiment on 30 April 1958. It was amended to correct the unit designation from Regiment to Battalion on 20 February 1959. It was redesignated for the 32nd Artillery Regiment on 24 July 1959. The insignia was redesignated effective 1 September 1971, for the 32d Field Artillery Regiment.

== Battalions ==
The regiment consists of six battalions.

=== 1st Battalion ===
The 1st Battalion 32nd Field Artillery Regiment "Proud Americans" was a Lance Missile battalion garrisoned at Fliegerhorst Kaserne in the Erlensee area of Hanau, West Germany from 1960 when it was activated as an Honest John unit. 1st Battalion later became a Lance battalion from 1974 through 1992 when it became part of 3rd Armored Division, V Corps and returned to Fort Sill to become a Multiple Launch Rocket System (MLRS) unit which it remains today. 1/32 FA consisted of 5 Batteries: Alpha, Bravo, Charlie, Headquarters, and Service Batteries, and was inactivated in 1992 as a Lance Missile unit and reactivated as a Multiple Launch Rocket System (MLRS) unit. The unit patch worn was the 41st FA Brigade which was under V Corps Artillery until August 1991 when it joined 3rd Armored Division (Spearhead) and adopted its patch before returning to Fort Sill in 1992 to become a MLRS battalion.

=== 2nd Battalion ===
The 2nd Battery, 32nd Field Artillery Regiment, the "Proud Americans", has existed, off and on, since 1918. It has participated in World War II, Vietnam, and the current War on Terrorism. In 2006, 2nd Battery, 32nd Field Artillery was activated as part of 4th Brigade Combat Team, 1st Infantry Division at Ft. Riley, Kansas. The battalion deployed to Baghdad, Iraq in February 2007 in support of Operation Iraqi Freedom (OIF) 07-08 as part of "The Surge." From February 2007 - April 2008, 2-32FA conducted infantry and security operations in southeast Mansour, Baghdad and established and manned Joint Security Station (JSS) Torch with Iraqi Defense & Police.

==== World War II ====
- Presidential Unit Citation, World War II, Streamer embroidered EL GUETTAR
- French Croix de Guerre with Palm, World War II, Streamer embroidered KASSERINE
- French Croix de Guerre with Palm, World War II, Streamer embroidered NORMANDY
- French Croix de Guerre, World War II, Fourragere
- Belgian Fourragere 1940
- Cited in the Order of the Day of the Belgian Army for action at Mons
- Cited in the Order of the Day of the Belgian Army for action at Eupen-Malmedy

==== Vietnam ====
- Valorous Unit Award, Streamer embroidered CU CHI DISTRICT
- Valorous Unit Award, Streamer embroidered TAY NINH PROVINCE
- Meritorious Unit Commendation (Army), Streamer embroidered VIETNAM 1965–1966
- Meritorious Unit Commendation (Army), Streamer embroidered VIETNAM 1968–1969
- Republic of Vietnam Cross of Gallantry with Palm, Streamer embroidered VIETNAM 1965–1968
- Republic of Vietnam Cross of Gallantry with Palm, Streamer embroidered VIETNAM 1968–1970
- Republic of Vietnam Cross of Gallantry with Palm, Streamer embroidered VIETNAM 1970–1971
- Republic of Vietnam Cross of Gallantry with Palm, Streamer embroidered VIETNAM 1971
- Republic of Vietnam Civil Action Honor Medal, First Class, Streamer embroidered VIETNAM 1965–1971

Battery A additionally entitled to:

- Valorous Unit Award, Streamer embroidered TAY NINH PROVINCE 1970
- Valorous Unit Award, Streamer embroidered FISH HOOK

Battery B additionally entitled to:

- Valorous Unit Award, Streamer embroidered FISH HOOK

==== Inactive years, Desert Storm and drawdown ====
Inactivated at Fort Lewis in 1972, the battalion spent 15 years on the inactive roll until its activation on 16 August 1987 as a member of the 42d FA Brigade. The battalion was equipped with Lance missiles until 1989, when the battalion was inactivated once again. In 1990 the battalion was activated in Giessen, Germany as the first active ATACMS capable MLRS unit. When USAREUR was tasked with providing units for deployment for Desert Shield it was decided that the battalion and its ATACMS capability should remain in Germany as a strategic theater-level deterrent to the Soviets. However, a select number of soldiers from the battalion were attached to other deploying MLRS units to bring them up to 100% strength. After Desert Storm, the unit was reassigned to 41st FA Brigade. After the reunification of Germany and the collapse of the Soviet Union, the battalion cased its colors once again, on 15 December 1993 in Giessen, Germany.

==== Modern ====
Activated 16 January 2006 at Fort Riley, Kansas.

For this deployment, the Battalion was awarded the following VUA:

Valorous Unit Award, Streamer embroidered BAGHDAD 2007-2008

From 2009 until 2010, the 2nd Battalion, 32nd Field Artillery, Task Force Patriot, as part of the 4th Brigade Combat Team (Dragon Brigade), 1st Infantry Division served in Tikrit, Iraq where it continued to conduct dismounted infantry operations to secure the populace and defeat extremist, insurgent, and criminal threats to security. 2/32 was the last combat unit to leave Iraq at the conclusion of Operation Iraqi Freedom. For this deployment, the Battalion was awarded the following MUC:

Meritorious Unit Commendation (Army), Streamer embroidered IRAQ 2009-2010

From May 2012 until February 2013, the 2nd Battalion, 32nd Field Artillery, Task Force Dragon, as part of the 4th Brigade Combat Team, 1st Infantry Division served in RC East Afghanistan, Paktika province, where the unit conducted counter-fire operations to guarantee security for the populace along the Pakistan border and cease Taliban, Haqqani, insurgent, networks and activity. The unit also participated and started the first training of Afghan National Army artillery units in Paktika. These efforts allowed the ANA to fire their first autonomous combat missions in support of their own troops engaged with insurgent activities. The 2nd Battalion, 32nd Field Artillery, were able to conduct join fire missions with the ANA D-30 units.

The 2nd Battalion, 32nd Field Artillery, also continued their tradition of "firsts" with the first rounds fired for the 1st Infantry Division in Afghanistan. For this deployment, the Battalion was once again awarded the MUC, perpetuating a multi-generational record of stellar military achievement:

Meritorious Unit Commendation (Army), Streamer embroidered AFGHANISTAN 2012-2013

Beret flash worn by 2/32nd FAR and 2/319th FAR

Airborne background trimming of 2/32 FAR (formerly worn by 2/320 FAR)

In 2015, the 2nd Battalion, 32nd Field Artillery Regiment replaced 2nd Battalion, 320th Field Artillery Regiment to become the 101st Airborne Division's air assault artillery unit for the 1st Infantry Brigade Combat Team.

== See also ==
- Field Artillery Branch (United States)
