= National Defense Act of 1920 =

American law to reorganize the Army

National Defense Act
- Long title: An Act To amend an Act entitled "An Act formaking further and more effectual provision for the national defense, and for other purposes," approved June 3, 1916, and to establish military justice
- Enacted by: the 66th United States Congress
- Effective: June 4, 1920

Citations
- Public law: 66-242

Legislative history
- Introduced in the House as H.R. 12775

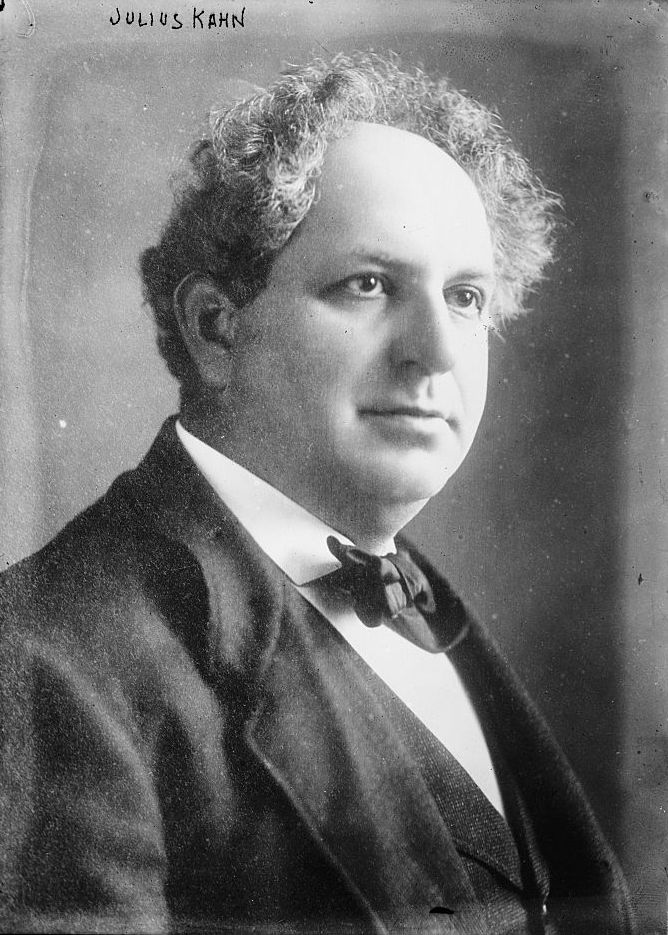
Rep. Julius Kahn, Sponsor of the National Defense Act of 1920

The National Defense Act of 1920 (or Kahn Act) was sponsored by United States Representative Julius Kahn, Republican of California. This legislation updated the National Defense Act of 1916 to reorganize the United States Army and decentralize the procurement and acquisitions process for equipment, weapons, supplies and vehicles. It was passed by Congress on June 4, 1920.

== Reorganization of the Army ==
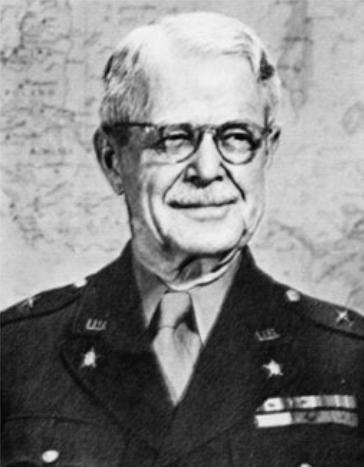
Brigadier General John McAuley Palmer, military theorist and advocate for the National Guard

Advocated by John McAuley Palmer and other proponents of the National Guard, the legislation established the Army of the United States as an organization of three components: a) the Regular Army, b) the National Guard, and c) the Organized Reserve. The Organized Reserve included the Officers’ Reserve Corps, Enlisted Reserve Corps and Reserve Officers' Training Corps. The act increased the maximum allowed peacetime strength of the Regular Army from 175,000 to 280,000 enlisted men, and of the National Guard to 435,800 enlisted men, with a corresponding number of officers to provide effective command. The Act completely reorganized and strengthened the National Guard.

=== Effects of Armistice, limited appropriations, and civilian life on implementation ===
Between November 15, 1918, and November 15, 1919, the Army discharged more than three million men. In February 1919, Congress authorized the Army to maintain a maximum of 175,000 enlisted men as a stopgap figure, and in May 1919, in the midst of demobilization, Congress appropriated enough funds for fiscal year 1920 to pay for an Army of 325,000 men. The Army expected that Congress would, in the future, appropriate yearly funds for an army of about 225,000. By law, all men who had entered the Army after April 1917 had to be discharged (i.e., leaving only about 50,000 men in the Army). This meant that the Army needed to quickly recruit about 125,000 men to maintain an army of 200,000 men.

In the spring of 1919, voluntary enlistments in the Army, suspended for the duration of the war, were resumed. An intensive recruiting campaign that was the brainchild of the Secretary of War, Newton D. Baker, offered one and three-year enlistments and touted the benefits of the War Department's programs of educational and vocational training for soldiers. Unfortunately, by the spring of 1920, the strength of the Army began to decline as one-year enlistments, objected to by Army leadership, began to expire and the enthusiasm created by the recruiting campaign began to subside. In spring 1920, the Army launched a new recruiting campaign, which was judged to have "fizzled," but men continued to enlist at a relatively consistent rate. By the end of fiscal year 1920 (June 30, 1920), after the passage of the amendments, the strength of the Army stood at 177,194 men.

In June 1920, both houses of Congress approved military appropriations that would give the Army enough money to maintain 175,000 men; opponents of the bill stated it was in direct conflict with the figures given in the National Defense Act amendments. By the end of 1920, the strength of the Army stood at about 200,000 men. President Woodrow Wilson vetoed the appropriations bill, but Congress overrode him, and Secretary of War Baker halted recruiting in February 1921. On the matter of funds for fiscal year 1922, Daniel R. Anthony, the chair of the House Subcommittee on Army Appropriations, preferred funds for an army of 150,000, while James W. Wadsworth, the chair of the Senate Subcommittee, stuck with the 175,000 figure. The appropriations bill was signed by President Warren G. Harding in June 1921. It mandated the Army swiftly reduce its size, by October 1921; Senator William E. Borah, another member of the Senate subcommittee, warned he would put forth a figure of funds for only 100,000 men for the next fiscal year if Harding objected to the short timetable.

In order to reduce strength, the Army discharged men under the age of eighteen, and men in the continental United States at their own application. Since the National Defense Act amendments set limits on the number of officers for the Army and the number of enlisted men in each grade, over 1,000 officers were involuntary separated. Despite the threat of mass demotions for senior enlisted men, only all "surplus" noncommissioned officers (those above the allowed number in each rank for whom no military occupation could be found) were reduced by one grade. For fiscal year 1923, the House proposed funds for only 115,000 men, while the Senate proposed funds for 140,000 men. A compromise for funds for 125,000 men was worked out, and the Army was forced to begin involuntary demotions of noncommissioned officers. The Pay Readjustment Act of 1922 placed the Army and the Navy under a single pay system for the first time. The flaws in the Act relating to the Army were twofold. Many senior noncommissioned officers, whose new pay grade had kept up with inflation, found themselves demoted to junior NCO status, whose pay in relation to those above them in rank had stagnated. Having chosen to make a career out of the Army and raise families on the additional pay, they now found potential promotions blocked by younger men. Many were forced to leave the Army and return to civilian life, where pay was higher. The second flaw was a reduction in pay for the lowest two grades of enlisted men. Like many of the demoted noncommissioned officers, these "non-career" soldiers, seeing other opportunities, chose to leave the Army and not re-enlist. By October 1922, the Army was slightly below its new authorized strength of 125,000, and in the spring of 1923, three-year enlistments as advocated for by Secretary of War Baker began to expire; another intensive recruiting campaign managed to avoid a major personnel headache for the Army. The Regular Army settled into a period of greatly reduced strength, not exceeding 120,000 men until 1936.

== Enhanced National Guard and Reserve role ==
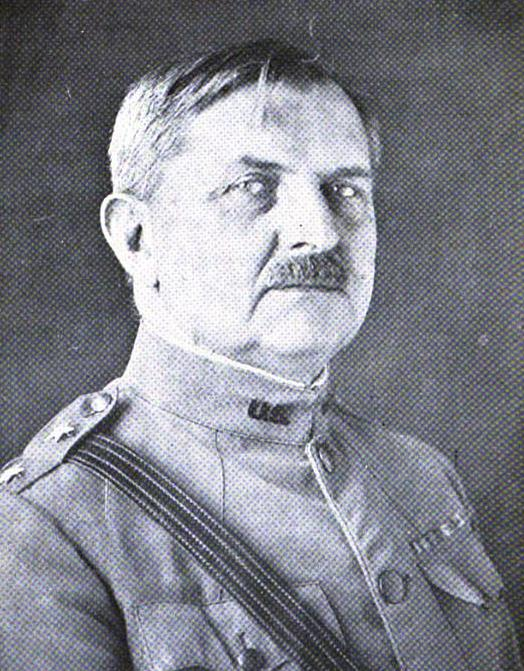
Major General George C. Rickards, the first National Guard officer to serve as Chief of the National Guard Bureau

The 1920 Act strengthened the National Guard and Organized Reserve in several ways. First, it directed that the Chief of the Militia Bureau be a National Guard officer as a way to better coordinate activities between the Army General Staff and the National Guard. Second, it permitted National Guard officers to serve on the Army's General Staff, enhancing their training opportunities and experience, and increasing the exposure of regular Army officers to the National Guard. Third, it required that the Army Staff create joint committees of Guard, Reserve and Regular Army officers when considering actions that would affect the Guard and Reserve, thus giving the Guard and Reserve input into plans and policies that could affect them.

The Regular Army Reserve (RAR), the most direct reserve force supplementing the Regular Army since an act of Congress on August 24, 1912, was continued in the National Defense Act of 1916 and abolished by the National Defense Act of 1920, but was revived by Congress in 1938. Members were required to be honorably discharged Regular Army soldiers who were unmarried, not over thirty-six years of age, and who could pass a physical examination. Enlistees received $24.00 a year, paid quarterly, if they reported their most recent address to their corps area commander for mobilization purposes. Service in the RAR did not confer any right towards retirement, retired pay, longevity pay, or reenlistment allowance, however, if RAR members reported for service during a national emergency, they would receive $3.00 for each month they had spent in the RAR, up to $150.00, in addition to having the same pay and allowances as men in the Regular Army of equivalent grade and length of service. The original goal was to enlist 75,000 men by 30 June 1942, but it was modified on 14 January 1939 to achieve that number as soon as possible. All RAR soldiers were ordered to active duty on 15 February 1941, and all enlistments in the RAR were suspended on 28 March 1941.

== Procurement and contracting ==
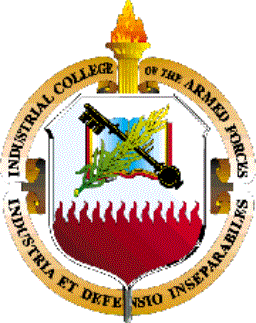
Seal of the Industrial College of the Armed Forces, based on design for Army Industrial College.

The National Defense Act of 1920 also required the Army to conduct studies and planning for wartime mobilization, rather than waiting for war to be declared to begin planning. This shift to contingency planning and a long-range outlook led to decentralization of the contracting and procurement process, and increased coordination between military leaders and leaders of business and industry. The need for specialists in procurement and mobilization planning led to the 1924 creation of the Army Industrial College.

== Legacy ==
The 1920 Act was the basis for the Army's organization through World War II, and remained largely in effect until passage of the National Security Act of 1947.
