= James L. Terry =

US Army general

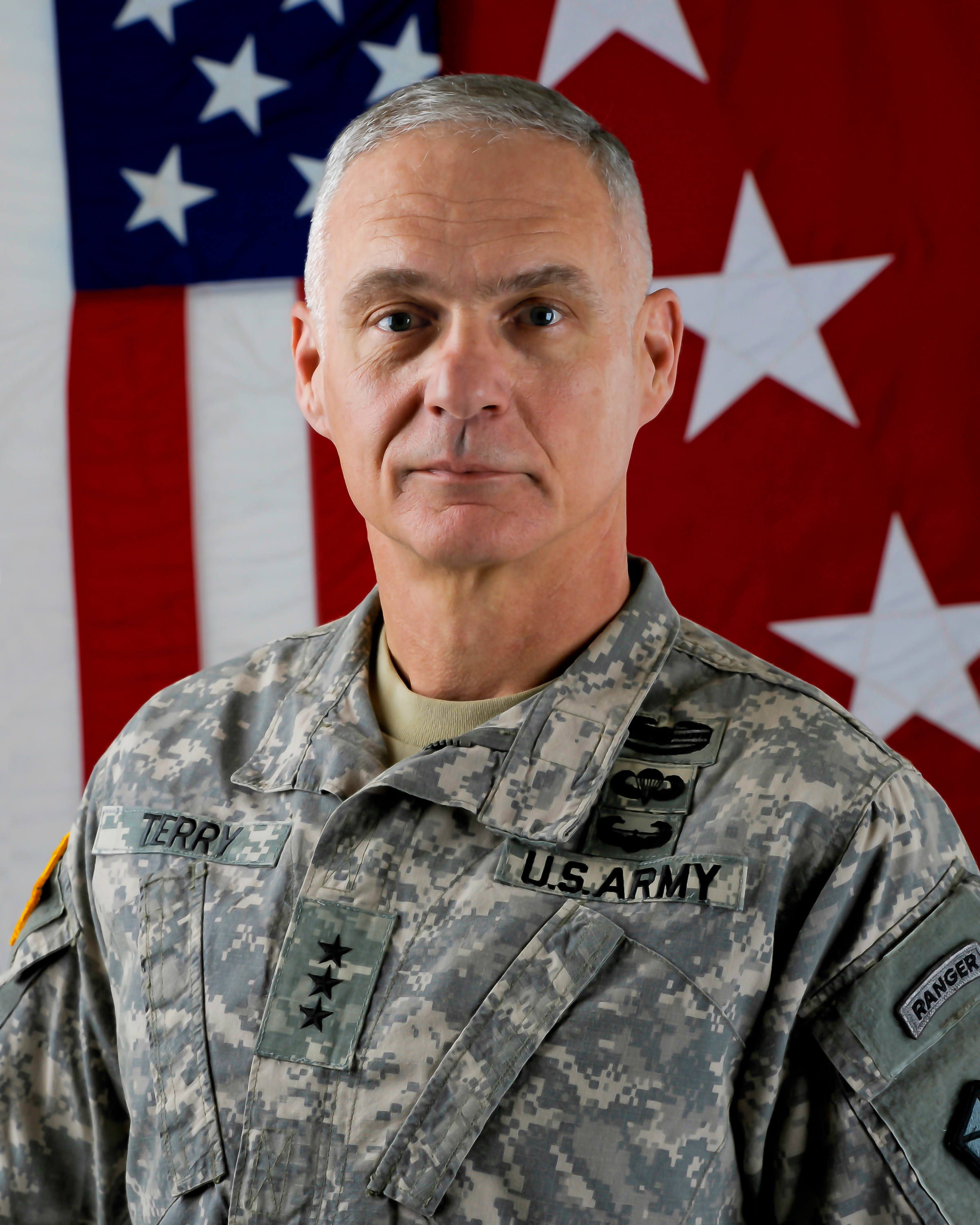
- Terry in uniform, 2012
- Born: May 14, 1957 (age 69); Chatsworth, Georgia, U.S.
- Military career
- Allegiance: United States
- Branch: United States Army
- Service years: 1978–2015
- Rank: Lieutenant General
- Commands: United States Army Central; Combined Joint Task Force – Operation Inherent Resolve; V Corps; 10th Mountain Division
- Conflicts: Operation Uphold Democracy; War in Afghanistan; Operation Inherent Resolve
- Awards: Defense Distinguished Service Medal; Army Distinguished Service Medal; Defense Superior Service Medal; Legion of Merit (6); Bronze Star Medal (2)

James L. Terry (born May 14, 1957) is lieutenant general of the United States Army. Terry has commanded at multiple levels across the Army. Terry's last assignment was as the commanding general of United States Army Central, retiring 17 November 2015. Terry served as the last commander of V Corps before its inactivation in 2013. While commanding V Corps, he concurrently served as Commander, International Security Assistance Force Joint Command (IJC), and as deputy commander of United States Forces Afghanistan. He was the Commanding General of the 10th Mountain Division (Light Infantry) from 2009 to 2011.

== Early life ==
Terry was born in Chatsworth, Georgia, on May 14, 1957. In 1978, he graduated from North Georgia College (now known as University of North Georgia) and, through Reserve Officers' Training Corps, was commissioned as an infantry officer.

== Military career ==
Terry has served in a wide variety of assignments, to include rifle platoon leader, company executive officer, and anti-tank platoon leader while stationed with the 1–15th Infantry, 3rd Infantry Division in Kitzingen, Germany; S-4 (logistics) and S-3 (operations) for the 1st Battalion, 327th Infantry, 101st Airborne Division (Air Assault) at Fort Campbell, Kentucky; assistant professor of military science and the assistant commandant of cadets at North Georgia College in Dahlonega, Georgia; battalion executive officer for the United Nations Command Security Force Battalion, the Joint Security Area, in Panmunjom, Korea; deputy G3 and brigade executive officer with the 101st Airborne Division (Air Assault) at Fort Campbell; executive officer to the Inspector General of the Army; chief of initiatives and deputy commander of the Joint Warfighting Center, United States Joint Forces Command in Norfolk, Virginia; and operations officer for the Coalition Forces Land Component Command, Army Central Command, at Camp Doha in Kuwait.

In 1981 Terry commanded A Company of the 2–327th Infantry, 101st Airborne Division (Air Assault) at Fort Campbell. He took command of the 2–22nd Infantry Battalion, 10th Mountain Division (Light Infantry), at Fort Drum, New York, in June 1994. During this command, he deployed with the battalion to Haiti in support of Operation Uphold Democracy. From April 1998 until July 2000, Terry commanded the 2nd Brigade, 25th Infantry Division (Light Infantry), at Schofield Barracks in Hawaii. After this assignment, he commanded the operations group of the Joint Readiness Training Center at Fort Polk, Louisiana.

Terry then assumed duties as the Assistant Division Commander for Operations, 10th Mountain Division (Light Infantry), in August 2004. From January 2006 to February 2007, he deployed with the unit in support of the War in Afghanistan as the Deputy Commanding General (Operations) for the Combined Joint Task Force 76 in Afghanistan.

=== 10th Mountain Division ===
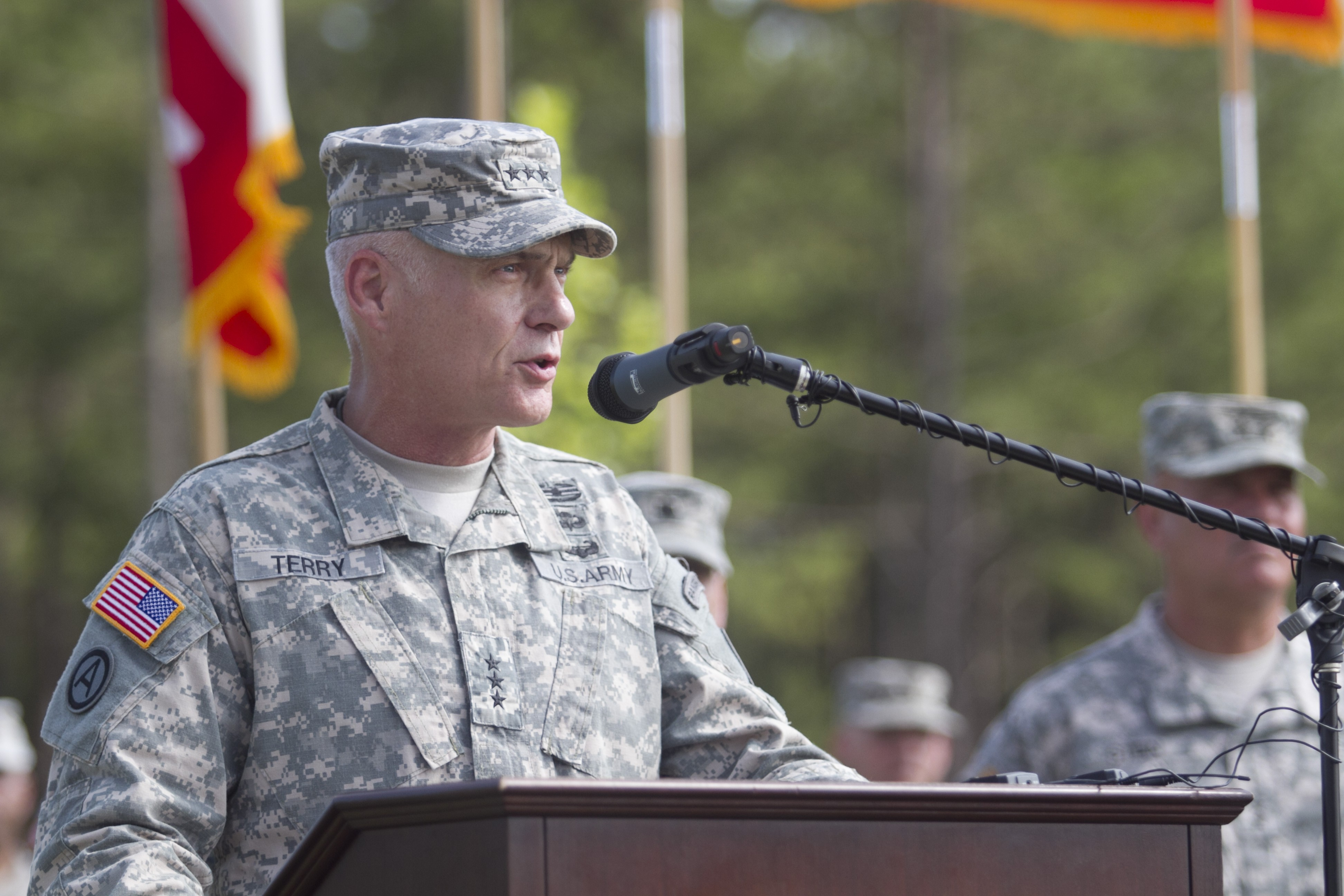
Lt. Gen. James L. Terry, commanding general, Third Army/ARCENT, addresses the local leadership, Third Army Soldiers, Families and civilians for the first time during a change of command ceremony on June 25, 2013.

From 2009 to 2011, Terry was commander of the 10th Mountain Division (Light Infantry). In October 2010, the division headquarters was designated as Combined Joint Task Force – 10, responsible for the command and control of coalition military forces in RC-South, which encompasses five of Afghanistan's southern provinces. Terry assumed command of RC-South from outgoing commander Major General Nick Carter in November 2010. On 1 October 2011, command of RC-South was transferred to Major General James L. Huggins, the commanding general of the 82nd Airborne Division.

=== V Corps ===
On 3 August 2011, the Department of Defense announced the nomination of Terry to the rank of lieutenant general and for command of V Corps, United States Army Europe and Seventh Army. On 5 November 2011, Terry handed over command of the 10th Mountain Division to its new commander Major General Mark A. Milley. Terry assumed command of V Corps in Wiesbaden, Germany on 10 January 2012, taking over from deputy commander and acting commander Ricky D. Gibbs, who continued to serve as Terry's deputy. In May 2012, V Corps deployed to Afghanistan to serve as the headquarters of the International Security Assistance Force Joint Command (IJC) for a period of one year. Terry continued to command V Corps while also serving as commander of IJC, and as deputy commander of United States Forces Afghanistan. Terry formally assumed command of IJC from Lieutenant General Curtis Scaparrotti on 12 June 2012.

== Training and education ==
Terry earned a Bachelor of Business Administration in Marketing and Management from North Georgia College. He has a Master of Arts in Business Administration from Webster University and a Master of Science in National Security Strategy and Policy from National Defense University.

Terry's military training includes Basic Airborne School, Army Ranger School, Air Assault School, Infantry Officer Basic and Advanced Courses, Combined Arms and Services Staff School, the Inspector General Course, the Command and General Staff Officer Course at Fort Leavenworth, Kansas; and the National War College, Fort Lesley J. McNair, Washington, DC.

== Awards and decorations ==
In 2011, Terry was awarded the NATO Meritorious Service Medal. On 12 September 2013, Terry was awarded the Meritorious Service Cross by the Governor General of Canada. Terry was presented this honor for his leadership of Regional Command South from November 2010 to October 2011. He is credited with supporting Canadian forces and promoting the importance of their mission in Afghanistan.

Terry's awards include:

Combat Action Badge
Expert Infantryman Badge
Basic Parachutist Badge
Ranger tab
Air Assault Badge
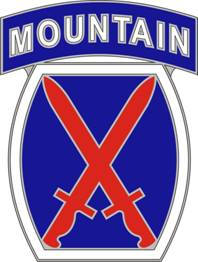
10th Mountain Division Combat Service Identification Badge
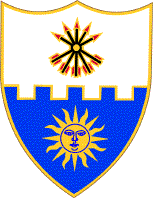
22nd Infantry Regiment Distinctive Unit Insignia
11 Overseas Service Bars

Defense Distinguished Service Medal
Army Distinguished Service Medal
Defense Superior Service Medal
Legion of Merit with one silver oak leaf cluster
Bronze Star Medal with oak leaf cluster
Defense Meritorious Service Medal
Meritorious Service Medal with silver oak leaf cluster
Army Commendation Medal with oak leaf cluster
Army Achievement Medal
Joint Meritorious Unit Award
Meritorious Unit Commendation
Army Superior Unit Award
National Defense Service Medal with one bronze service star
Armed Forces Expeditionary Medal
Afghanistan Campaign Medal with four campaign stars
Global War on Terrorism Expeditionary Medal
Global War on Terrorism Service Medal
Korea Defense Service Medal
Humanitarian Service Medal
Army Service Ribbon
Army Overseas Service Ribbon with bronze award numeral 7
NATO Meritorious Service Medal
NATO Medal for ISAF
Multinational Force and Observers Medal
Meritorious Service Cross, Military Division (Canada)

== See also ==
- Kandahar Province
- Operation Dragon Strike
- Khosrow Sofla

Military offices
Preceded by Michael L. Oates	Commander, 10th Mountain Division; 2009–2011	Succeeded by Mark A. Milley
Preceded by Kenneth W. Hunzeker	Commanding General, V Corps; 2012–2013	Unit inactivated
Preceded by Vincent K. Brooks	Commanding General, Third United States Army; 2013–2015	Succeeded by Michael X. Garrett
New command	Commanding General, Combined Joint Task Force – Operation Inherent Resolve; 2014–2015	Succeeded by Sean MacFarland
