= 1st Battalion, 320th Field Artillery Regiment =

US military unit

1st Battalion, 320th Field Artillery (1-320th FAR)
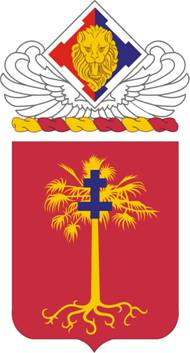
- 320th Field Artillery Regiment coat of arms
- Active: 1917–present
- Country: United States
- Branch: United States Army
- Type: Field artillery
- Size: Battalion
- Part of: 2nd Brigade Combat Team, 101st Airborne Division
- Garrison/HQ: Fort Campbell
- Nickname: "Top Guns"
- Motto: "Volens Et Potens"
- Equipment: M119A3 Howitzer; M777A2 Howitzer
- Engagements: World War I World War II; Operation Power Pack; Operation Urgent Fury; Operation Desert Storm; Operation Iraqi Freedom; Operations Enduring Freedom
- Decorations: Presidential Unit Citation (Army) for Ste. Mere Eglise; Presidential Unit Citation (Army) for Arghandab District of Kandahar Province, Afghanistan Jul-Aug 2010; French Croix de Guerre with Palm, World War II for Cotentin; French Croix de Guerre, World War II, Fourragere; Military Order of William (Degree of the Knight of the Fourth Class) for Nijmegen 1944; Netherlands Orange Lanyard; Belgian Fourragere 1940
- Battle honours: World War I: St. Mihiel; Meuse-Argonne; Lorraine 1918; World War II: Sicily; Naples-Foggia; Normandy (with arrowhead); Rhineland (with arrowhead); Ardennes-Alsace; Central Europe Armed Forces Expeditions: Dominican Republic (Operation Power Pack); Grenada (Operation Urgent Fury) Southwest Asia: Defense of Saudi Arabia (Operation Desert Shield); Liberation and Defense of Kuwait (Operation Desert Storm)

Commanders
- Battalion Commander: LTC Hunter
- Battalion Command Sergeant Major: CSM Lewis

Insignia
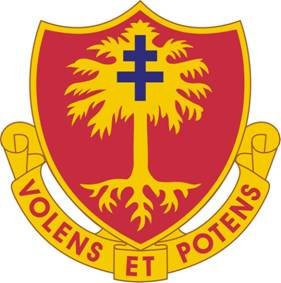
- Distinctive unit insignia

- Background trimming

The 1st Battalion, 320th Field Artillery Regiment (1-320th FAR) is the field artillery battalion assigned to the 2nd Brigade Combat Team, 101st Airborne Division. The battalion has been assigned to the 82nd Airborne Division, 11th Airborne Division and 101st Airborne Division. The battalion has participated in World War I, World War II, Operation Power Pack, Operation Urgent Fury, Operation Desert Storm, Operation Iraqi Freedom, Operation Enduring Freedom, and Operation Inherent Resolve.

== History ==
=== World War I ===
The 1-320 FAR's beginnings can be traced back to America's entry into the First World War. As part of the nation's mobilization, 1-320th was constituted, organized and activated in August 1917 as Battery A, 320th Field Artillery (A/320th FA). As part of the original 82nd Division, A/320th FA played a key role at Lorraine, St. Mihiel, and the Meuse Argonne region in France.

=== Interwar period ===
The 320th Field Artillery arrived at the port of New York on 7 May 1919 on the troopship USS Kentuckian and was demobilized on 12 May 1919 at Camp Dix, New Jersey. Pursuant to the National Defense Act of 1920, it was reconstituted in the Organized Reserve on 24 June 1921, assigned to the 82nd Division, and allotted to the Fourth Corps Area. The regiment was initiated on 7 December 1921 with regimental headquarters at Columbia, South Carolina. Subordinate battalion headquarters were concurrently organized as follows: 1st Battalion at Greenville, South Carolina, and 2nd Battalion at Sumter, South Carolina. The regimental headquarters was relocated on 8 July 1927 to Spartanburg, South Carolina. The regiment conducted annual summer training with the 2nd Battalion, 16th Field Artillery Regiment at Fort Bragg, North Carolina, and also conducted Citizens' Military Training Camps at Fort Bragg some years as an alternate form of summer training. The primary ROTC "feeder" school for new Reserve lieutenants for the regiment was The Citadel in Charleston, South Carolina.

=== World War II ===
In August 1942, when the 82nd Infantry Division was converted to an airborne division, the 320th FA (including A/320th) was reorganized and redesignated as the 320th Glider Field Artillery Battalion (GFAB). As part of the 82nd Airborne Division, the 320th GFAB fought in a number of hot spots. First, the 320th GFAB was part of the campaign in Sicily, acting in reserve. The unit first saw action at the Volturno River on the Italian mainland. The crucial Normandy invasion was the next stop for the 320th GFAB. Under difficult conditions, the unit helped make the invasion a success. As a result of the 320th's actions during Operation Overlord, the unit was awarded the Presidential Unit Citation. The 320th GFAB next fought in Operation Market Garden and then the Battle of the Bulge when the Germans attempted their last-ditch offensive. The 320th GFAB then fought and played a role in the final push through the Rhineland to defeat Germany. Upon the war's end the unit completed its duties in Europe as part of the post-war occupation in Berlin.

=== Post-World War II ===
After the war, the 320th GFAB went through a number of transitions. It was inactivated on 15 December 1948 and relieved from assignment to the 82nd Airborne Division on 14 December 1950. On 1 August 1951 it was reorganized and redesignated as the 320th Airborne Field Artillery Battalion (AFAB), and activated at Fort Benning, Georgia.

=== Post-Korean War ===
During the 1950s, the 320th FA served as the field artillery battalion of the separate 508th Airborne Regimental Combat Team. When the Army eliminated infantry regiments and battalions from division and organized under the Pentomic structure, the 320th Field Artillery was reorganized as a parent regiment under the Combat Arms Regiment System. A/320th FA was assigned to the 11th Airborne Division in Germany. A/320th FA was inactivated on 1 July 1958 in Germany when the 11th Airborne was inactivated and replaced by the 24th Infantry Division. A/320th FA were redesignated on 15 November 1962 as Headquarters and Headquarters Battery, 1st Battalion, 320th Artillery, and assigned to the 82d Airborne Division (organic elements concurrently constituted).

26 April 1965, President Johnson ordered paratroopers from the 82d Airborne Division; XVIII Airborne Corps; Company E, 7th Special Forces Group; and Marines from the Amphibious Squadron 10 to the Dominican Republic as part of Operation Power Pack to protect American lives and to prevent a possible Castro-type takeover by Communist elements. The 1-320 FAR was alerted on 28 April 1965 and ordered to move to the Dominican Republic by 1 May 1965 as part of Task Force Power Pack II, which contained two airborne infantry battalions of the 325th Airborne Infantry Regiment (AIR) and other supporting elements totaling 2,276 men. The remainder of the 325th AIR and 1-320 FAR were sent as part of Power Pack III a few days later. On 26 May 1965, US Forces began withdrawal from the Dominican Republic as Central and South American troops assumed peacekeeping duties.

=== Post-Vietnam ===
On the evening of 24 October 1983, (the day after the Bombing of the Marine Barracks in Beirut) the 2nd Brigade, 82nd Airborne Division, including the 1-320th FAR and other support units were formally alerted as the 82d Airborne Division's "Division Ready Brigade" to begin its 18-hour rapid deployment sequence to execute combat operations in support of Operation Urgent Fury on the Caribbean island of Grenada. The DRF 1 (Division Ready Force 1) package was activated and paratroopers of 2d Brigade were "wheels up" from Pope Air Force Base within 17 hours of notice. Parts of the 1-320 FAR were sent to an intermediate staging base (ISB) in Barbados to await the staging of the rest of the division to concentrate the projection of forces from a shorter distance. Once Rangers from 1st & 2nd Battalions had secured Point Salinas Airport during an airborne assault of the airport, the 82d Airborne elements cancelled their airborne assault and air-landed at Point Salinas. Elements of Batteries B and C arrived on the island during the evening of 25 October 1983 without their guns and provided rear area security in the vicinity of the runway.

Early on the morning of 26 October 1983, Battery B's guns began arriving, followed closely by most of C Battery's guns. Battery B began firing direct support missions later that morning from the south side of Point Salinas airfield, bombarding the "Cuban Barracks" early that morning and later firing the prep fire for the Ranger assault on the campus at Grand Anse and the rescue of the students held there. Once Battery C's guns arrived, the guns originally joined B Battery. Once the majority of C battery arrived, it was repositioned to the north side of the runway near the airport terminal. Battery B was moved to join Battery C the next day. From there, Batteries B & C fired the 30-minute prep fires for the assault by the Rangers on Calvigny Barracks. The Batteries were both lived north to the vicinity of the Golflands golf course on the Sunday of the first week of the operation. This allowed them to cover portions of the island being secured by the 325th Infantry Battalions. Batteries B and C redeployed to Fort Bragg early in November 1983. Combat operations continued till 15 December 1983 when last elements of the battalion redeployed to Fort Bragg, NC.

On 2 October 1986, 1-320 FAR was relieved from assignment to the 82d Airborne Division and assigned to the 101st Airborne Division (Air Assault). No personnel moved in this transition; instead, 1-320 FAR in the 82nd reflagged as 2-319 (which had been assigned to the 101st) and 1-321 FAR in the 101st reflagged as 1-320 FAR. Simultaneous assignments resulted in all three field artillery battalions in the 82nd carrying the designation of the 319th Airborne Field Artillery Regiment (AFAR) and all in the 101st being flagged as elements of the 320th Field Artillery Regiment. Prior to the reflagging, the 82nd Division Artillery consisted of 1–319, 1–320, and 2–321 FA, while the 101st Division Artillery consisted of 3–319, 2–320, and 1–321 FA.

=== Gulf War ===
1-320 FAR next saw action in the Middle East from 1990 until 1991. As a part of the 101st Airborne Division (Air Assault), the battalion was part of the massive US force that drove the Iraqi Army from Kuwait.

=== Operation Iraqi Freedom I ===
During the preparations for OIF I, A/1-320 FAR deployed two weeks ahead of the battalion's main body to support port operations of the entire invasion.

=== Operation Iraqi Freedom III ===
1-320 FAR under the 2nd Brigade Combat Team, 101st Airborne Division (Air Assault) was ordered to deploy to the CENTCOM AOR in late September 2005. Upon completion of a JRTC mission rehearsal exercise in April 2005, it began a 5-month intensive train up to prepare for the next deployment.

LTC Rafael Torres, Jr. took command of the unit on 17 March 2005 and immediately began to prepare for Iraq. The battalion conducted live fire exercises in June and then began transitional training in motorized infantry tactics due to the change of mission for Iraq.

The battalion began deployment in August 2005. The rest of the battalion began deploying in late September to Camp Taji the second week of October 2005. Iraqi National elections were scheduled to be held on 15 October, equipment was delayed in Kuwait until the 20th, after the elections. The unit conducted a RIP/TOA (relief in place/transfer of authority) with 1–118th FA (Georgia Army National Guard) and the 70th Engineer Battalion (3rd Brigade, 1st Armored Division) and completed the TOA on the 26th. The 1–320th detached a firing platoon from B Battery to 1–502 Infantry Battalion to conduct counter fire operations in Mahmudiyah. The battalion's radar section deployed with the 4th BDE 101st, to the Mahmudiyah area also. While in Mahmudiyah, the Radar section conducted numerous counter-fire missions which resulted in the firing of over 1400 rounds of artillery. The 1–320th also detached a MiTT (Military Transition Team) team to work with an Iraqi Army Battalion in support of 1–22 IN and 1–10 CAV in and around Southeast Baghdad and at FOB Falcon.

1–320th FA controlled check points, conducted cordon and searches and patrolled villages with populations up to 1000 residents. The battalion detained over 100 insurgents, which resulted in a third of them being prosecuted and imprisoned at Abu Ghraib. The unit was also responsible for finding numerous weapons and ammo caches which included hundreds of mortar, artillery, tank rounds and 200 pound aerial bombs; seized weapons including 8 mortar tubes, 500 rifles and RPG launchers, and thousands of rounds of small arms ammunition.

In Taji, Iraq the battalion suffered 6 KIAs by enemy action:

- MSG James F. Hayes, Battery A
- SSG James E. Estep, Battery A
- SGT Clarence L. Floyd, Battery A
- SPC Matthew J. Holley, Headquarters and Headquarters Battery
- SPC Alexis Roman-Cruz, Battery A
- PFC Travis J. Grigg, Battery A

In late November, the battalion received a change of mission to assume the duties of the Area Defense Operations Cell (ADOC) at Camp Victory located in the Victory Base Complex (VBC) surrounding the Baghdad International Airport.

The 1–320th conducted a RIP/TOA with the 2–299th IN (Hawaii Army National Guard) and completed the TOA on 7 January 2006. Its mission on Camp Victory required the 1-320th to conduct patrols in three villages neighboring the camp in Baghdad, control entry access and patrol the Al Faw Palace, as well as numerous Force Protection missions to ensure the security of the Multi-National Coalition-Iraq (MNC-I) and Multi-National Forces-Iraq (MNF-I) Headquarters on Camp Victory.

While conducting ADOC operations on Camp Victory, 1-320th FAR provided security and CMO operations to the VBC and surrounding villages of Al Furat, Iraqi Family Village, and Airport Village.

1–320th completed over 200 force protection improvement projects on Camp Victory and conducted over 3 million dollars in projects to improve the quality of life for our Iraqi neighbors. Meanwhile, at FOB Falcon, 16 soldiers of the "Top Guns" Battalion Military Transition Team (MiTT) were conducting continuous combat operations in support of 1–22 IN and 1–10 CAV in and around Southeast Baghdad.

The battalion redeployed to Fort Campbell in August 2006.

=== Operation Iraqi Freedom VII-IX ===
1-320 FA deployed to Iraq for a third time in October 2007, remaining more than a year and redeploying in early 2009. One member of Top Guns died during this deployment:

SPC Jacob Fairbanks, Battery B, 9 April 2008

=== Operation Enduring Freedom 10–11 ===
1-320 FA deployed to southern Afghanistan in July 2010. Under the command of LTC David Flynn, Task Force Top Guns operated as a maneuver battalion in the Arghandab District of Kandahar Province. The battalion was awarded a Presidential Unit Citation for its actions from 13 July - 12 August 2010.
They participated in Operation Dragon Strike. Eight members of Task Force Top Guns were KIA during this deployment:

- PFC Brandon M. King, Battery A, 14 July 2010
- SPC Michael L. Stansbery Jr., Headquarters and Headquarters Battery, 30 July 2010
- SGT Kyle B. Stout, Headquarters and Headquarters Battery, 30 July 2010
- MSG (R) Robert W. Pittman, Jr., Asymmetric Warfare Group, attached to 1-320th, 30 July 2010.
- SGT Patrick K. Durham, Battery B, 28 August 2010
- SPC Andrew J. Castro, Company B, 2nd Brigade Special Troops Battalion, attached to 1-320th, 28 August 2010
- 1LT Todd W. Weaver, Headquarters and Headquarters Battery, 9 September 2010
- SSG Eric S. Trueblood, 720th Explosive Ordnance Disposal Company, attached to 1-320th, 10 March 2011

=== Operation Enduring Freedom 12 ===
In early 2012, the 1-320th deployed with 2nd BCT to conduct security force assistance in northeast Afghanistan.

=== Operation Enduring Freedom 14 ===
From February to November 2014, 1-320th deployed to Afghanistan, its sixth deployment of the Global War on Terror. Under the command of LTC Mark Sherkey, the battalion provided security force assistance to Afghan National Security Forces as well as maintaining the security of Bagram Air Field. The battalion conducted Operations Mountain Guardian, Top Guns, and Strike I, II and III, as well as providing security for numerous VIPs, including the President of the United States, the US Secretary of Defense, the Czech Republic Minister of Defense, numerous US congressmen and ambassadors from various countries. During this deployment, the battalion was the first unit to employ the M119A3 howitzer in combat. In a ceremony on 1 November 2014, the battalion transferred its responsibilities to the 2nd Squadron, 3rd Stryker Cavalry Regiment and the Georgian Army's 51st Light Infantry Battalion.

In May 2015, SFC Daniel King, from Headquarters and Headquarters Battery, was awarded the Gruber award by the Commandant of the Field Artillery, for his contributions advising and assisting the 201st Afghan National Army Corps Fires Center of Excellence at Gamberi.

== Lineage and honors ==
=== Lineage ===
- Constituted 5 August 1917 in the National Army as Battery A, 320th Field Artillery, an element of the 82d Division
- Organized 29 August 1917 at Camp Gordon, Georgia
- Demobilized 12 May 1919 at Camp Dix, New Jersey
- Reconstituted 24 June 1921 in the Organized Reserves as Battery A, 320th Field Artillery, an element of the 82d Division (later redesignated as the 82d Airborne Division)
- Organized in December 1921 at Columbia, South Carolina
- Reorganized and redesignated 13 February 1942 as Battery A, 320th Field Artillery Battalion
- Ordered into active military service 25 March 1942 and reorganized at Camp Claiborne, Louisiana
- Reorganized and redesignated 15 August 1942 as Battery A, 320th Glider Field Artillery Battalion

(Organized Reserves redesignated 25 March 1948 as the Organized Reserve Corps)

- Withdrawn 15 November 1948 from the Organized Reserve Corps and allotted to the Regular Army
- Inactivated 15 December 1948 at Fort Bragg, North Carolina

(320th Glider Field Artillery Battalion relieved 14 December 1950 from assignment to the 82d Airborne Division)

- Redesignated 1 August 1951 as Battery A, 320th Airborne Field Artillery Battalion, and activated at Fort Benning, Georgia
- Reorganized and redesignated 1 March 1957 as Battery A, 320th Artillery, and assigned to the 11th Airborne Division
- Inactivated 1 July 1958 in Germany and relieved from assignment to the 11th Airborne Division
- Redesignated 15 November 1962 as Headquarters and Headquarters Battery, 1st Battalion, 320th Artillery, and assigned to the 82d Airborne Division (organic elements concurrently constituted)
- Battalion activated 7 December 1962 at Fort Bragg, North Carolina
- Redesignated 1 September 1971 as the 1st Battalion, 320th Field Artillery
- Relieved 2 October 1986 from assignment to the 82d Airborne Division and assigned to the 101st Airborne Division
- Relieved 16 September 2004 from assignment to the 101st Airborne Division and assigned to the 2nd Brigade Combat Team, 101st Airborne Division

=== Campaign participation credit ===
- World War I: St. Mihiel; Meuse-Argonne; Lorraine 1918
- World War II: Sicily; Naples Foggia; Normandy (with arrowhead); Rhineland (with arrowhead); Ardennes-Alsace; Central Europe
- Armed Forces Expeditions: Dominican Republic; Grenada
- Southwest Asia: Defense of Saudi Arabia; Liberation and Defense of Kuwait
- War on Terrorism
  - Afghanistan: Consolidation III; Transition I
  - Iraq: Liberation of Iraq; Transition of Iraq; Iraqi Governance; National Resolution; Iraqi Surge

Note: The published Army lineage, dated 18 September 1996, shows no War on Terrorism campaigns. Comparison of the battalion's deployment dates with the War on Terrorism campaigns estimates that the battalion will be credited with participation in the seven campaigns listed.

=== Decorations ===
- Presidential Unit Citation (Army) for STE. MERE EGLISE
- Presidential Unit Citation (Army) for AFGHANISTAN 2010
- Meritorious Unit Commendation (Army) for IRAQ 2003
- Meritorious Unit Commendation for IRAQ 2005-2006
- Meritorious Unit Commendation (Army) for IRAQ 2007-2008
- French Crois de Guerre with Palm, World War II for STE. MERE EGLISE
- French Crois de Guerre with Palm, World War II for COTENTIN
- French Crois de Guerre with Palm, World War II Fourrragere
- Military Order of William (Degree of the Knight of the Fourth Class) for NIJMEGEN 1944
- Netherlands Orange Lanyard
- Belgian Fourragere 1940
  - Cited in the Order of the Day of the Belgian Army for action in the ARDENNES
  - Cited in the Order of the Day of the Belgian Army for action in BELGIUM AND GERMANY

Note: Separately cited awards are not listed on the official lineage published by the Center for Military History.

== Heraldry ==
=== Distinctive unit insignia ===
320th Field Artillery Regiment Distinctive Unit Insignia

=== Coat of arms ===
320th Field Artillery Regiment Coat of Arms

== See also ==
- Field Artillery Branch (United States)
- Lower Babur
- Khosrow Sofla
