= Edwin H. Burba Jr. =

American general (born 1936)

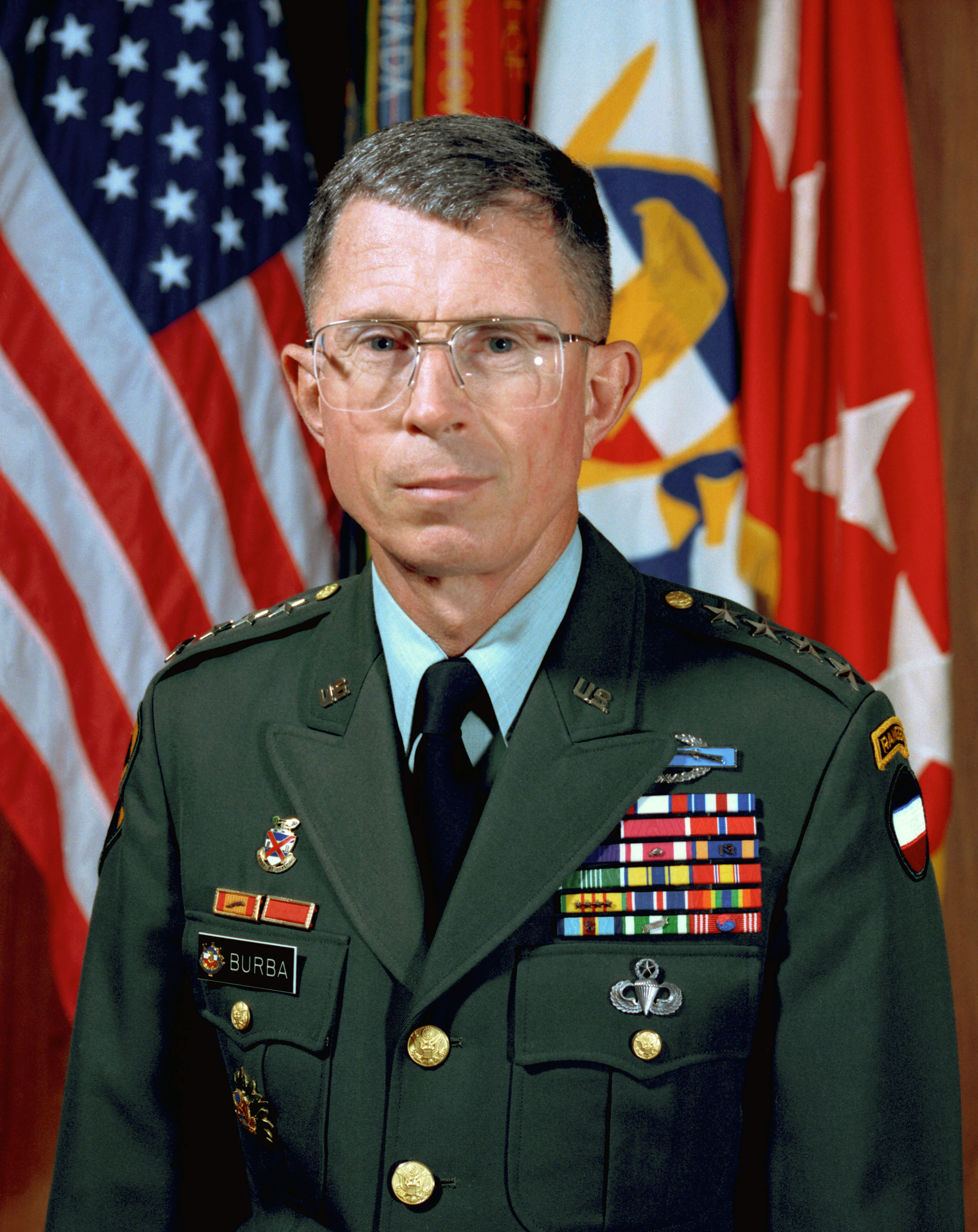
- Official portrait, 1990
- Born: 13 September 1936 (age 90); McAlester, Oklahoma, U.S.
- Education: United States Military Academy (BS); George Washington University (MS)
- Military career
- Allegiance: United States
- Branch: United States Army
- Service years: 1959–1993
- Rank: General
- Commands: United States Army Forces Command; ROK/US Combined Field Army; 7th Infantry Division; United States Army Infantry School
- Conflicts: Vietnam War; Tet Offensive
- Awards: Defense Distinguished Service Medal; Army Distinguished Service Medal; Silver Star; Legion of Merit; Bronze Star Medal; Purple Heart

Edwin Hess Burba Jr. (born 13 September 1936) is an American retired general who last served as commander-in-chief of the United States Army Forces Command from 1989 to 1993. Commissioned from the United States Military Academy in 1959 as an Infantry officer, he was later deployed for the Vietnam War, where he was awarded the Silver Star, the Bronze Star, the Purple Heart, and the Air Medal. Burba then held several staff and command assignments, notably including as deputy commander and commander of the United States Army Infantry School from 1983 to 1987, where he acquired new weapons and changed officer training. He then commanded the 7th Infantry Division from 1987 to 1988. He also led the Combined Field Army in South Korea from 1988 to 1989, where he introduced new training concepts to the Republic of Korea Army. As commander of Forces Command, Burba mobilized, trained, and deployed the majority of the Army troops that fought in the Gulf War, before retiring in 1993.

== Early life, family, and education ==
Edwin Hess Burba Jr. was born in McAlester, Oklahoma, on 15 September 1936. His father, Major General Edwin H. Burba Sr., was a combat veteran who had served in Europe and North Africa during World War II, and was the deputy commander of the First Army from 1968 until his death in a plane crash in 1970. Burba attended the United States Military Academy at West Point, New York, and graduated in 1959, receiving a Bachelor of Science degree in engineering and a commission as a second lieutenant of Infantry. He also received a Master of Science degree in international affairs from George Washington University in 1977. Burba is married to Trish, and they have three daughters.

His military education included completing the Infantry Officer Basic and Advance Courses (the latter in 1967), the Armed Forces Staff College, and the National War College in 1977. He also completed Ranger School and Airborne School.

== Army career ==
Burba served in the 504th Airborne Infantry Regiment at Fort Bragg, North Carolina, from 1960 to 1962. From 1963, he served in Okinawa, Japan, as a psychological warfare officer and detachment commander in the 7th Psychological Operations Group. He also served with the 1st and 5th Special Forces Groups. During that time he had deployments to Korea, Thailand, and Vietnam. After that, as a captain, Burba attended the Infantry Officer Advanced Course in 1967. He then had a second tour in Vietnam from 1967 to 1968, serving as operations officer of the 1st Battalion, 8th Cavalry Regiment, 1st Cavalry Division. Burba was severely wounded by automatic weapons fire during the Tet Offensive in early 1968, but returned to duty after four months. He was awarded the Silver Star, the Bronze Star, the Purple Heart, and the Air Medal during his second deployment in Vietnam.

After returning to the United States, he served as a company commander at the Army Training Center in Georgia, and served at the United States Air Force Academy, from 1968 to 1971. After that, he was a battalion commander (1st Battalion, 13th Infantry) and an operations and training officer, S-3, with the 8th Infantry Division in Germany, from 1971 to 1974. He then served at the Army Military Personnel Center in Alexandria, Virginia, from 1974. After completing his studies at the National War College and George Washington University in 1977, Burba served as the Chief of the Field Training Branch at the Air Force Academy in Boulder, Colorado, from 1977 to 1979.

He commanded the 1st Brigade, 4th Infantry Division, in Boulder, Colorado, from 1979 to 1981. Burba was the chief of staff of Army Recruiting Command from 1981 to 1982, then served as the executive officer to the chief of staff of the United States Army from 1982 to 1983. Promoted to brigadier general, he then served at the Infantry School at Fort Benning, first as deputy commanding general from 1983 to 1984, and then as commanding general from 1984 to 1987. During his time there, Burba completely reformed the Infantry Officer Basic and Advanced Courses to improve tactical and leadership training for officers; orchestrated the acquisition of the Squad Automatic Weapon, the improved M-16 rifle, night vision, and the Javelin anti-tank missile for infantry units; and completed the development of the Bradley Infantry Fighting Vehicle.

As a major general, Burba commanded the 7th Infantry Division at Fort Ord, California, from 1987 to 1988. Promoted to lieutenant general, from 1988 he served as commanding general of the Combined Field Army in Korea. While there, Burba introduced new training concepts to the Republic of Korea Army. He then served as the commander-in-chief, United States Army Forces Command, from 1989 to 1993, with the rank of general. During his tenure at Forces Command, Burba mobilized, trained, and deployed the majority of the Army that was deployed for the Gulf War. He retired in 1993.

== Later career ==
After retiring from military service, Burba worked as a senior observer with the Army's Battle Command Training Program. He received the Distinguished Graduate Award in 2003 from the West Point Association of Graduates.

== Decorations ==
Burba's awards and decorations include the Defense Distinguished Service Medal, Army Distinguished Service Medal, Silver Star, Legion of Merit, Bronze Star Medal, Air Medal with 13 Oak Leaf Clusters, and Purple Heart. He has also earned the Master Parachutist Badge, Ranger tab and the Combat Infantryman Badge.
