= M119 howitzer =

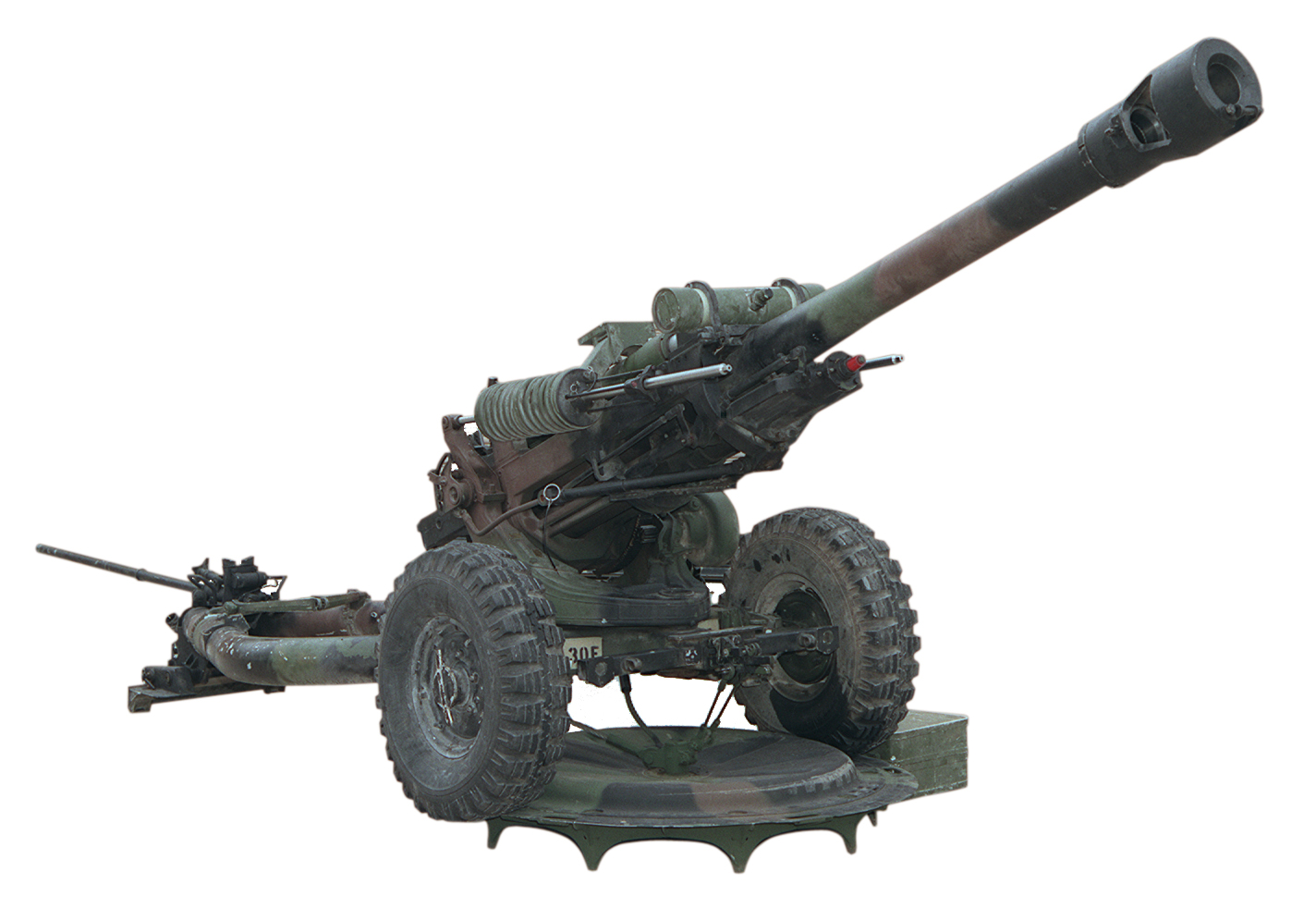
- Type: Towed field gun
- Place of origin: United States

Service history
- Used by: See operators
- Wars: War in Afghanistan (2001-2021); Iraq War; Saudi Arabian–led intervention in Yemen; Russian invasion of Ukraine

Production history
- Manufacturer: Joint Manufacturing Technology Center of Rock Island Arsenal
- Produced: 1989–2013
- Variants: M119, M119A1, M119A2, M119A3

Specifications (M119A1)
- Mass: With BII: 5,110 lb (2,320 kg); Without BII: 4,690 lb (2,130 kg); Cannon alone: 1,389 lb (630 kg); Combat: 4,268 lb (1,936 kg)
- Barrel length: 10 ft 6 in (3.20 m) L/30.48
- Width: 5 ft 10 in (1.78 m)
- Height: Combat: 7 ft 3 in (2.21 m); Travel: 4 ft 6 in (1.37 m)
- Crew: 5 to 7
- Shell: Semi-fixed 105 x 372 mm R
- Caliber: 105 mm (4.13 in)
- Elevation: -5.625° (−100 mils) to +69.975° (+1,244 mils)
- Traverse: 5.625° (100 mils) left or right
- Rate of fire: Maximum: 8 rpm for 3 minutes Sustained: 3 rpm for 30 minutes
- Maximum firing range: Charge 7: 17,500 m (10.9 mi); Charge 8 (with RAP): 19,500 m (12.1 mi)
- Sights: 3 × M90A2 telescope, M137A1 panoramic telescope

The M119 howitzer is a lightweight 105 mm howitzer, used by the United States Army. It is the American licensed version of the British L119 light gun. The M119 is typically towed by the M1097 or M1152 High Mobility Multi-Purpose Wheeled Vehicle (HMMWV), and can be easily airlifted by helicopter, or airdropped by parachute.

== Development ==
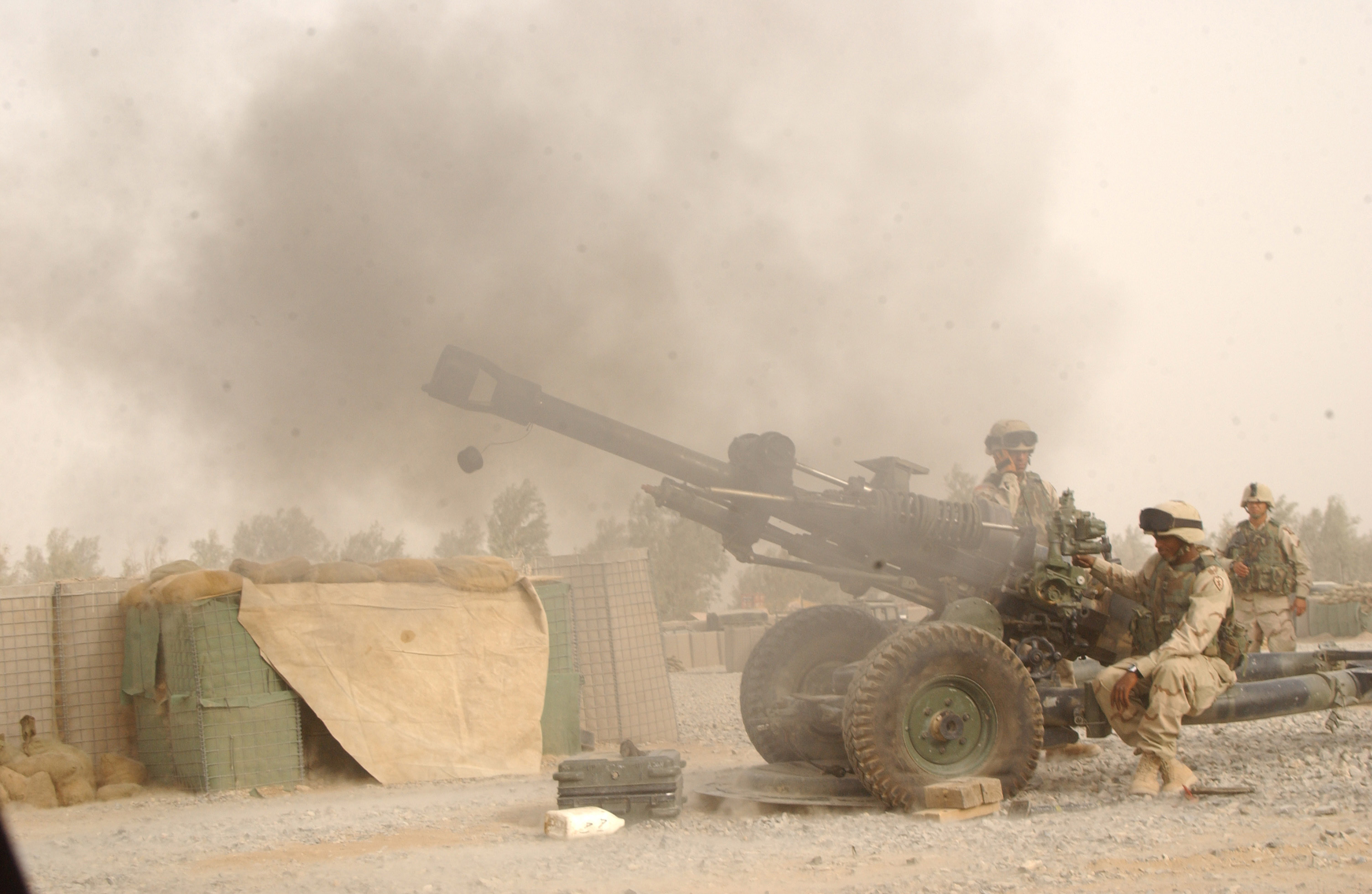
M119 Howitzer as part of a training exercise conducted near Kandahar Airfield, Afghanistan, September 17, 2004

The howitzer was designed and produced by the British Royal Ordnance Factories as the L118 light gun. In the L118 configuration, the 105 mm ammunition is cased separate loading ammunition. The L118 entered service with the British Army in 1976 and is used by parachute and commando field artillery regiments. It saw combat during the Falklands War, where the 30 guns in action fired up to 400 rounds per gun per day, mostly at "charge super"—i.e., the most powerful propellant charge available.

The L119 is the L118 reconfigured to fire NATO-standard 105 mm semi-fixed ammunition.

In 1987 an agreement was reached to produce the L119 under license by the US as the M119, to replace the M102 howitzer. It entered service with the 7th Infantry Division, Fort Ord, California, in December 1989. Some improvements were made to produce the M119A1, expanding upon its extreme low temperate envelope from −22 to −49 °F (−30 to −45 °C), therefore improving both maintainability and reliability. The Army renewed contracts for the M119 to be produced by the Rock Island Arsenal-Joint Manufacturing & Technology Center (RIA-JMTC) at Rock Island, Illinois, into the year 2013. The M20A1 cannon assembly for the M119 was manufactured by US Army Watervliet Arsenal.

The M119 is currently fielded with all Regular Army and National Guard infantry brigade combat teams, including those in the 10th Mountain, 82nd Airborne, and 101st Airborne divisions, and the 173rd Airborne Brigade Combat Team. Other divisions may be of mixed composition between armor, Stryker, and infantry brigade combat teams, with armor having M109A6s Paladins and Stryker having M777s for their fires battalions. For example, two of four are IBCTs with M119s in the 25th Infantry Division. National Guard light field artillery battalions assigned to IBCTs also have M119s, for example the 86th IBCT (Mountain) headquartered in Vermont. It is routinely airdropped in airborne operations and sling-loaded under CH-47 Chinook or UH-60 Black Hawk helicopters in air assault operations.

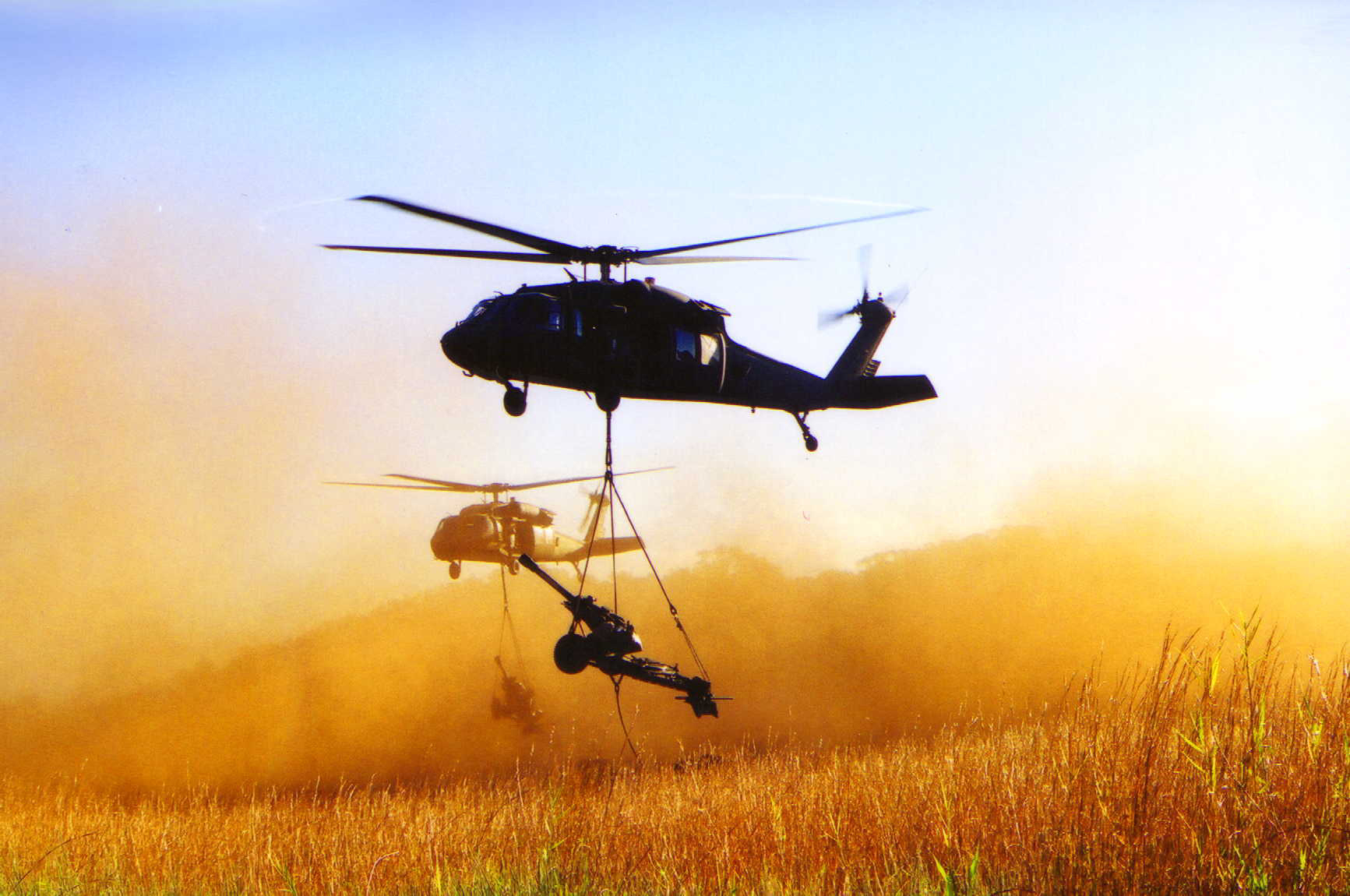
M119 slingloaded by UH-60 Blackhawk

In April 2009, the M119A2 howitzer was being fielded by the 4th Infantry Brigade Combat Team of the 3rd Infantry Division to provide better support in operations in Afghanistan and Iraq. It was the only brigade in the division equipped with it, as the other three brigades were Armored Brigade Combat Teams, and therefore equipped with the M109A6 Paladin.

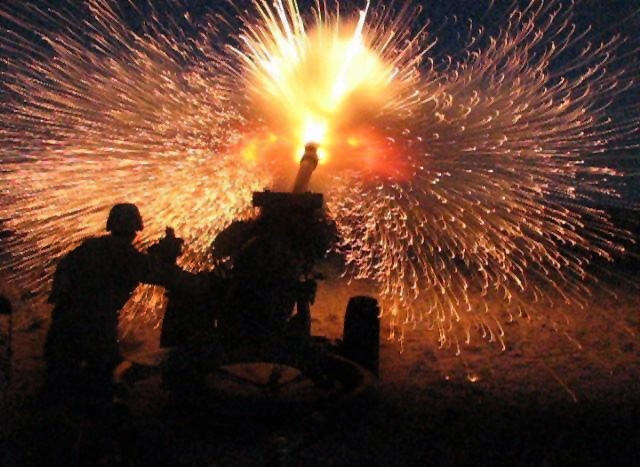
105mm howitzer being fired by A Battery, 2-218th Field Artillery of Oregon

Alpha Battery of the 1st Battalion, 320th Field Artillery Regiment, 101st Airborne Division received their first upgraded M119A3 howitzers in July 2013, and became the first unit to operate it in theater when they were deployed to northeast Afghanistan in early February 2014. The digitally upgraded M119A3 includes software and hardware component upgrades, GPS for navigation, a digital gunner's display, and digital communication between each gun and the fire direction center to speed up the process of receiving firing data and firing shells. Firing platoons were also equipped with larger, also digital M777A2 howitzers, and the M119A3 was more admired for being faster, lighter, and easier to change azimuth of fire. The A3-model retains manual capabilities of the A2-model, so occasions where digital capabilities were lost allowed crews to easily transition back to the analogue mode of operation and continue their missions.

Project Manager for Towed Artillery Systems (PM TAS) has developed several upgrades for the M119A3 including digital fire control, increased low temperature capability from −25 to −51 °F (−32 to −46 °C), and the M20 breech. The recoil system is also being upgraded, as the legacy system had reliability issues with the recuperator, buffer, and variable recoil linkage (which sets recoil length based on elevation); it had a lot of moving parts needing constant maintenance and adjustment during operations with high replacement rates of spares that are complex to manufacture and require specialized tooling to assemble, increasing costs and causing availability problems. The redesigned system operates the same, but modifies and simplifies some components, including a new buffer and recuperator with a majority of the components removed, and adds the Suspension Lockout System (SLOS) that fixes recoil length at 25 in (64 cm), which removes variable-recoil hardware, reduces stress on the carriage, and lowers buffer rod forces; the new system reduces cost, the system consists of 124 parts and the redesign will reduce that number by 40 percent to 75 parts and reusing 47 parts will consist of 65 percent for the current system, therefore only needing to manufacturing 28 new parts with overall weight savings of 45 lb (20 kg).

== Ammunition ==
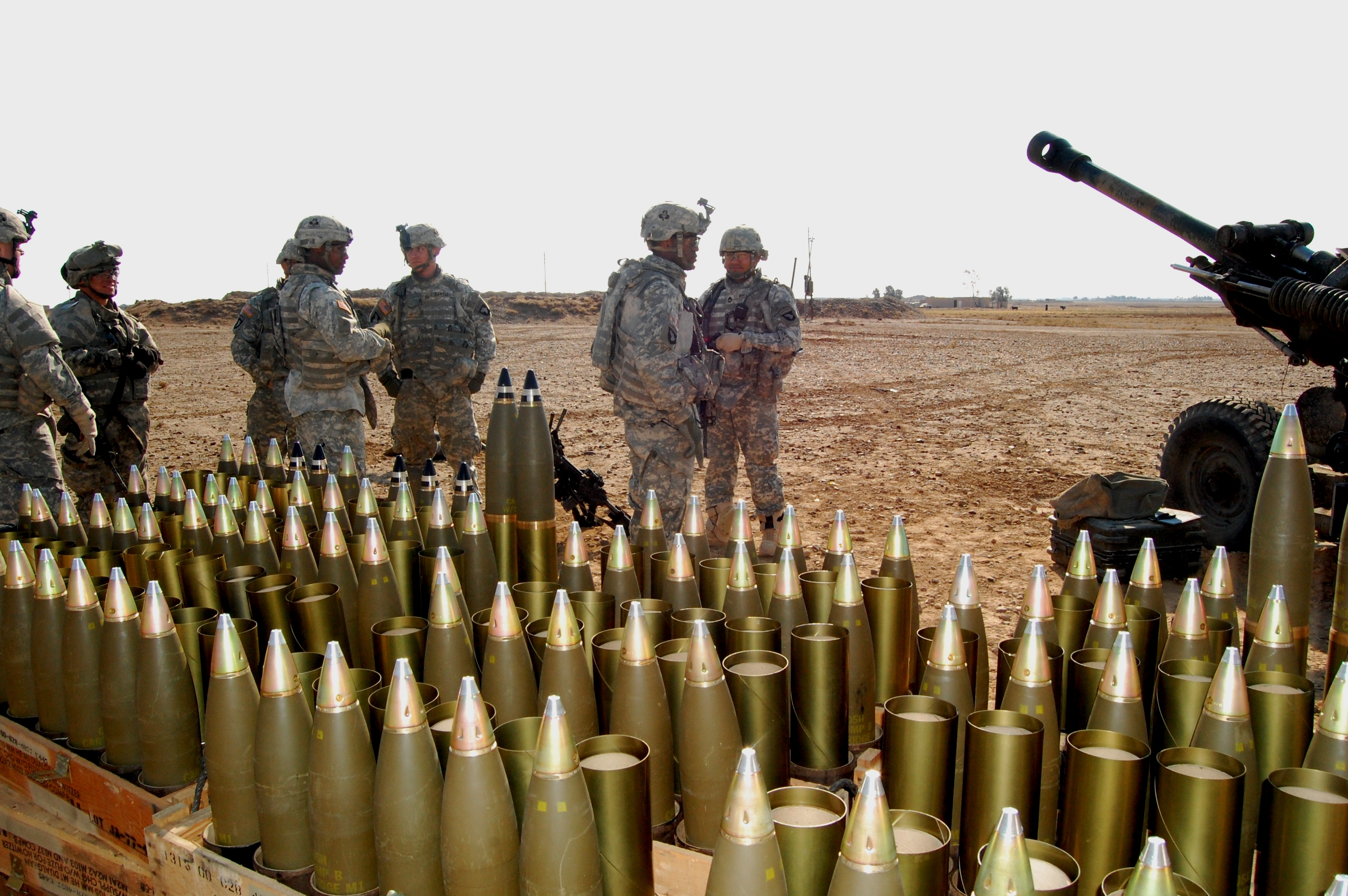
M119 ammo in the Iraq War (M1 projectiles with point detonating and variable time fuzes)

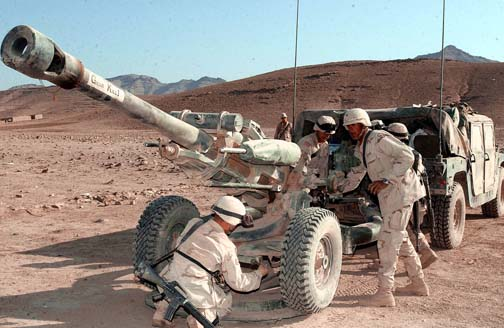
Soldiers with the 3rd Battalion, 7th Field Artillery Regiment, 25th Infantry Division (Light) position an M119A1 howitzer near Forward Operating Base Cobra, Afghanistan, 23 October 2004.

The M119 fires standard NATO semi-fixed ammunition:

- with M67 propelling charges:
  - M1 (HE) – High Explosive projectile, range: 11.5 km (7.1 mi), 2.1 kg of explosive filling
  - M60 (WP) – White Phosphorus smoke generating projectile, range: 15.1 km (9.4 mi) (current variant: M60A2)
  - M84 (HC) – Hexachloroethane smoke generating projectile, range: 11.5 km (7.1 mi) (current variant: 105 mm M84A1)
  - M314 (VL) – Visible Light illuminating projectile, range: 19.5 km (12.1 mi) (current variant: M314A3)
  - M444 (APICM) – Dual-Purpose Improved Conventional Munition (withdrawn from service), range: 11.5 km (7.1 mi)
  - M916 (DPICM) – Dual-Purpose Improved Conventional Munition (withdrawn from service), range: 11.5 km (7.1 mi)
  - M927 (HERA) – High Explosive Rocket Assisted projectile, range: 16.5 km (10.3 mi)
  - M1064 (IR) – Infrared illuminating projectile, range: 19.5 km (12.1 mi)
  - M1130 (HE PFF BB) – High Explosive Pre-Formed Fragments Base Bleed projectile – range: 13.0 km (8.1 mi)
- with M176 propelling charges:
  - M548 (HERA) – High Explosive Rocket Assisted projectile, range: 15.1 km (9.4 mi)
- with M200 propelling charge:
  - M760 (HE) – High Explosive projectile, range: 14.0 km (8.7 mi)
  - M915 (DPICM) – Dual-Purpose Improved Conventional Munition (withdrawn from service), range: 14.1 km (8.8 mi)
- with M219 propelling charge:
  - M913 (HERA) – High Explosive Rocket Assisted projectile, range: 19.5 km (12.1 mi)
- with M350 propelling charges:
  - M1130A1 (HE PFF BB) – High Explosive Pre-Formed Fragments Base Bleed projectile, range 17.0 km (10.6 mi)

The M119 also fires the M395 blank cartridge, which is used for burials, retreat ceremonies, and VIP Salutes as well as to simulate battlefield noise used for training exercises.

== Variants ==
- M119 – original copy of the L119
- M119A1 – minor improvements, including fire control and maintenance
- M119A2 – improved sight package consisting of telescope (M90A3) or panoramic telescope (M137A2)
- M119A3 – modernized version with digital fire control system and an inertial navigation system for self location; entered service in April 2013 with A Battery 3/319th Field Artillery at Fort Bragg, NC

== Operators ==
- Kurdistan Region
  - Peshmerga: M119 howitzers provided by the United States.
- Saudi Arabia
  - Saudi Arabian Army
- United States:
  - US Army, 821 M119A2/A3 as of January 2025
- Ukraine
