= Michael X. Garrett =

US Army general (born 1961)

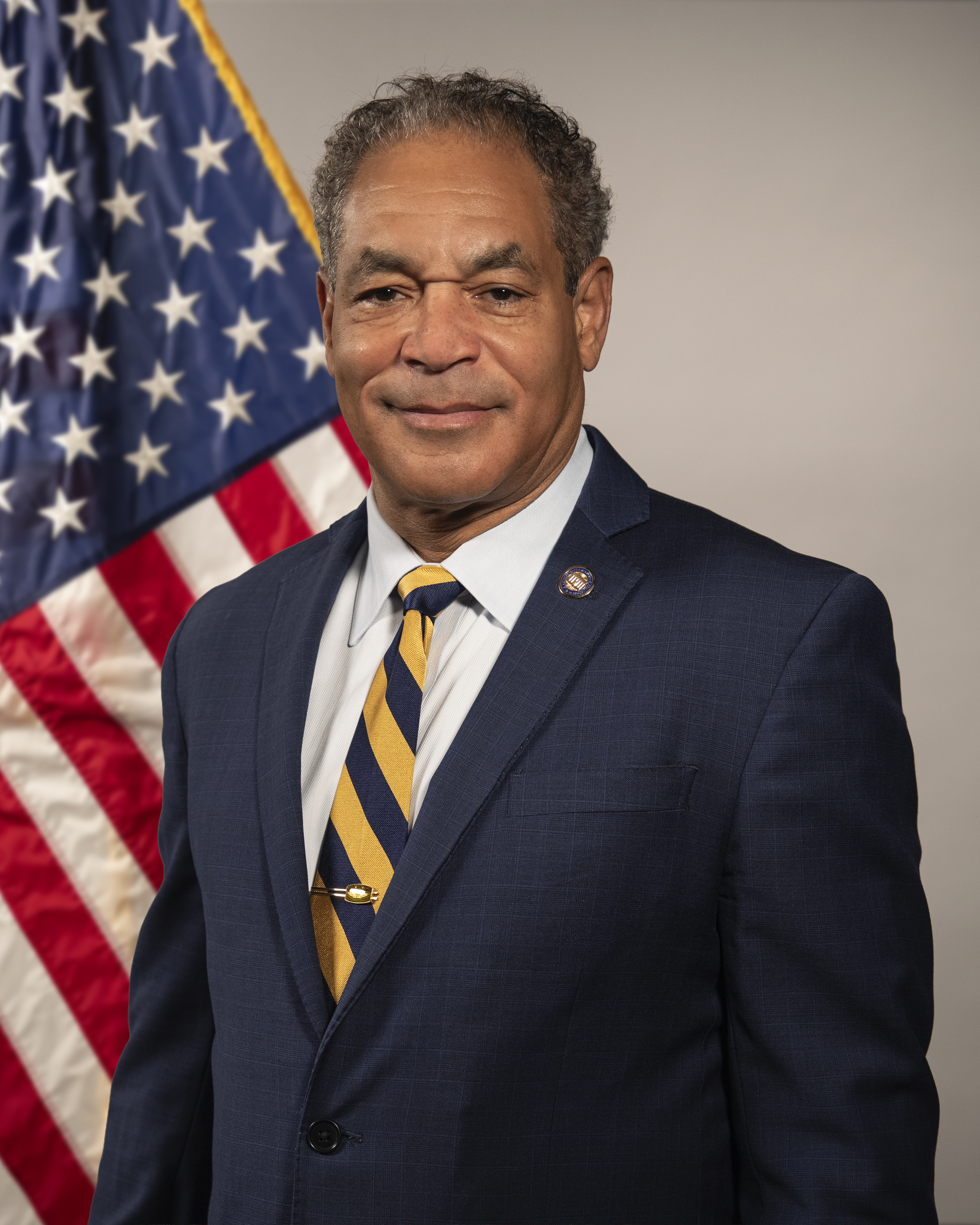
- Official portrait, 2021

13th Chairman of the American Battle Monuments Commission
- Incumbent
- Assumed office August 1, 2023
- President: Joe Biden; Donald Trump
- Preceded by: Mark Hertling

Personal details
- Born: 1961 (age 64–65) Cleveland, Ohio, U.S.
- Awards: Army Distinguished Service Medal (2); Defense Superior Service Medal (3); Legion of Merit (5); Bronze Star Medal (3)

Military service
- Allegiance: United States
- Branch/service: United States Army
- Years of service: 1984–2022
- Rank: General
- Commands: United States Army Forces Command; United States Army Central; United States Army Alaska; 4th Brigade Combat Team (Airborne); 3rd Battalion, 325th Infantry (Airborne)
- Battles/wars: War in Afghanistan; Iraq War

Michael Xavier Garrett (born 1961) is a former General in the United States Army who served as commanding general of United States Army Forces Command from 2019 to 2022. He previously served as the commanding general of United States Army Central, chief of staff of United States Central Command and commanding general of United States Army Alaska.

The son of Edward Garrett, a retired Army command sergeant major, Garrett is from Cleveland, Ohio and attended High School in Germany. He was commissioned in 1984 into the Infantry upon his graduation from Xavier University. Garrett was nominated for promotion to general to become the commanding general of United States Army Forces Command in January 2019. He was confirmed by the Senate for the position in February and assumed command in March. Garrett retired from the Army in September 2022.

President Joe Biden appointed Garrett as commissioner for the American Battle Monuments Commission in July 2023, and he was elected to serve as chairman on 1 August 2023.

== Assignments ==
Garrett was the commanding general of United States Army Forces Command, located at Fort Bragg, North Carolina. He previously served as the commanding general of United States Army Central, located at Shaw Air Force Base, South Carolina.

Garrett's assignments include chief of staff of United States Central Command, commanding general of United States Army Alaska, deputy commander of United States Alaskan Command and multiple joint and operational tours, staff assignments at numerous levels as well as several commands. Highlights include commanding 3rd Battalion, 325th Infantry (Airborne), 82nd Airborne Division at Fort Bragg, North Carolina. He deployed to Afghanistan as chief of current operations, Combined Task Force 180 in support of Operation Enduring Freedom. He then commanded 4th Brigade Combat Team (Airborne), 25th Infantry Division (Light), which deployed in support of Operation Iraqi Freedom. Following brigade command, Garrett served as the deputy commanding general of United States Army Recruiting Command. Following his tour with Recruiting Command, Garrett returned to Fort Bragg where he served as the Chief of Staff, XVIII Airborne Corps. As the XVIII Airborne Corps chief of staff, he deployed to Iraq in support of Operation New Dawn, where he served as the deputy chief of staff for United States Forces-Iraq.

== Education ==
Garrett's military education includes completion of the Infantry Officer Basic and Advanced courses, the United States Army Command and General Staff College, and a prestigious Senior Service College Fellowship. He also holds a bachelor's degree in Criminal Justice from Xavier University.

== Awards and decorations ==
Combat Infantryman Badge
Master Parachutist Badge
Ranger tab
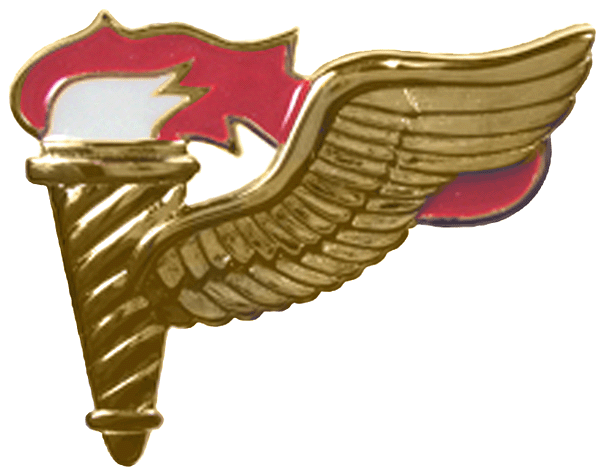
Pathfinder Badge
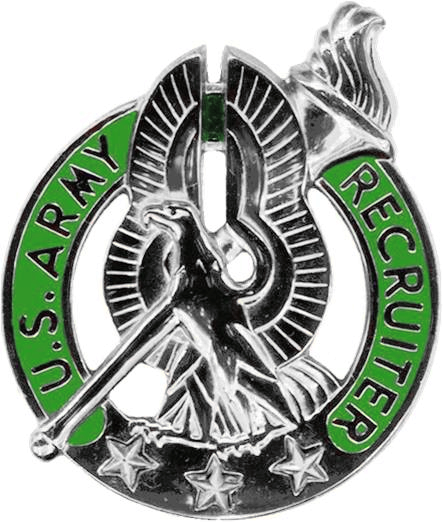
Basic Army Recruiter Badge
British Parachutist Badge
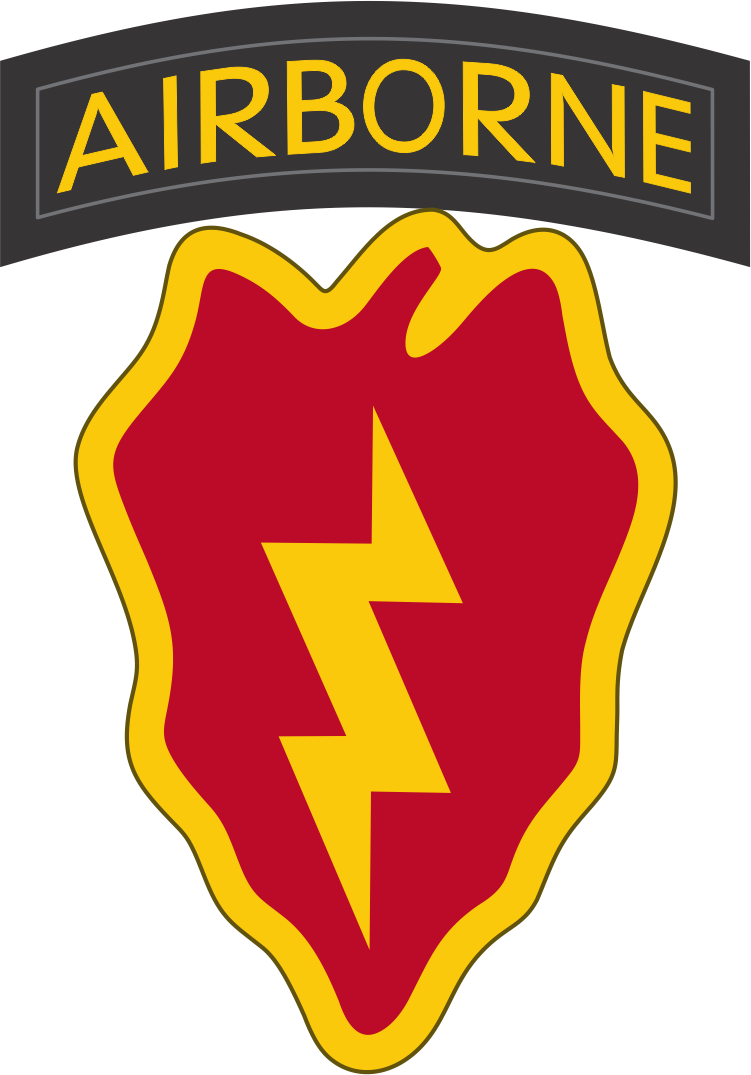
4th Brigade Combat Team (Airborne), 25th Infantry Division Combat Service Identification Badge
75th Ranger Regiment Distinctive Unit Insignia
5 Overseas Service Bars

Army Distinguished Service Medal with one bronze oak leaf cluster
Defense Superior Service Medal with two oak leaf clusters
Legion of Merit with four oak leaf clusters
Bronze Star Medal with two oak leaf clusters
Defense Meritorious Service Medal
Meritorious Service Medal with four oak leaf clusters
Joint Service Commendation Medal
Army Commendation Medal with four oak leaf clusters
Joint Service Achievement Medal
Army Achievement Medal
Joint Meritorious Unit Award with three oak leaf clusters
Army Meritorious Unit Commendation
National Defense Service Medal with one bronze service star
Iraq Campaign Medal with three service stars
Global War on Terrorism Expeditionary Medal
Global War on Terrorism Service Medal
Korea Defense Service Medal
Humanitarian Service Medal
Army Service Ribbon
Army Overseas Service Ribbon with bronze award numeral 6

Military offices
Preceded by Raymond P. Palumbo	Commanding General of United States Army Alaska; 2012-2013	Succeeded by Raymond F. Shields Jr.
Preceded by Raymond P. Palumbo	Deputy Commander of the Alaskan Command; 2012-2013	Succeeded by Raymond F. Shields Jr.
Preceded by Karl R. Horst	Chief of Staff of United States Central Command; 2013-2015	Succeeded by Terry R. Ferrell
Preceded by James L. Terry	Commanding General of the United States Army Central; 2015–2019	Succeeded by Terry R. Ferrell
Preceded by Robert B. Abrams	Commanding General of the United States Army Forces Command; 2019–2022	Succeeded by Andrew P. Poppas
