= Terry R. Ferrell =

Retired lieutenant general in the United States Army

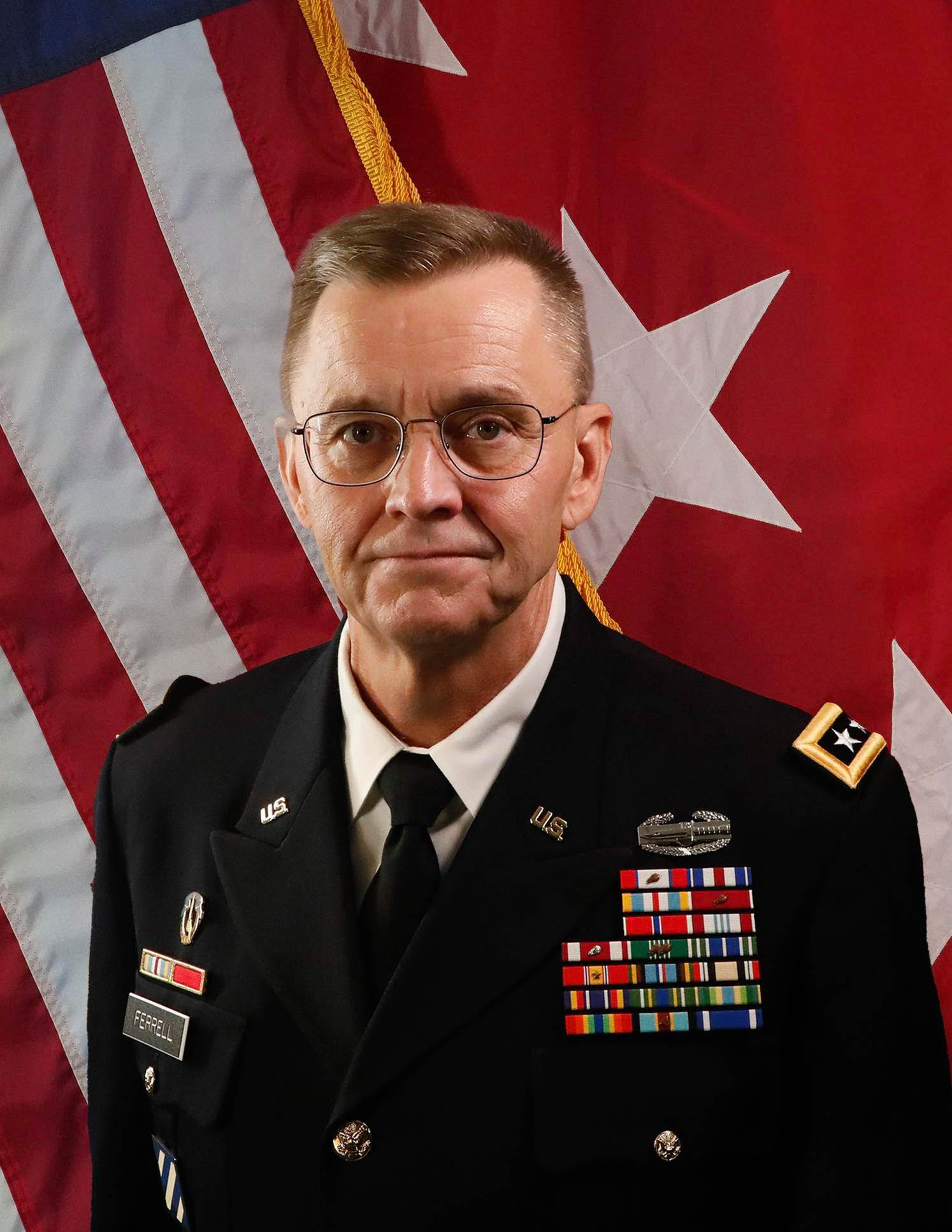
- Born: 1962 (age 63–64)
- Military career
- Allegiance: United States
- Branch: United States Army
- Service years: 1984–2021
- Rank: Lieutenant General
- Commands: United States Army Central; 7th Infantry Division; Combined Joint Task Force - Horn of Africa; 2nd Brigade, 3rd Infantry Division
- Conflicts: NATO intervention in Bosnia and Herzegovina; Iraq War
- Awards: Army Distinguished Service Medal (2); Silver Star; Defense Superior Service Medal; Legion of Merit (2); Bronze Star Medal

Terry R. Ferrell (born 1962) is a retired lieutenant general in the United States Army, who last served as the commanding general of United States Army Central from March 8, 2019, to August 4, 2021. A native of Logan, West Virginia, Ferrell is a graduate of Marshall University and was commissioned in 1984. He is married to Robbie Woods Ferrell, a retired Army colonel.

He relinquished command of U.S. Army Central to Ronald P. Clark on August 4, 2021, and held his retirement ceremony the same day.

Military offices
Preceded by Robert B. Abrams	Commanding General of the Fort Irwin National Training Center; 2011-2012	Succeeded by Theodore D. Martin
Preceded by Michael X. Garrett	Chief of Staff of the United States Central Command; 2015–2018	Succeeded by Michael Kurilla
Preceded by ???	Special Assistant to the Commander of the United States Central Command; 2018–2019	Succeeded by ???
Preceded by Michael X. Garrett	Commanding General of the United States Army Central; 2019–2021	Succeeded by Ronald P. Clark
