= United States Army Forces Command =

United States Army command

- FORSCOM shoulder sleeve insignia
- Founded: 1 July 1973
- Disbanded: 5 December 2025
- Country: United States
- Branch: United States Army
- Type: Command (military formation)
- Role: Provide combat-ready army forces to unified combatant commands
- Garrison/HQ: Fort Bragg
- Motto: Freedom's Guardian
- Website: Army Forces Command

Commanders
- Notable commanders: Bernard W. Rogers; Richard E. Cavazos; Colin L. Powell

Insignia
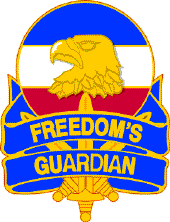
- Distinctive unit insignia

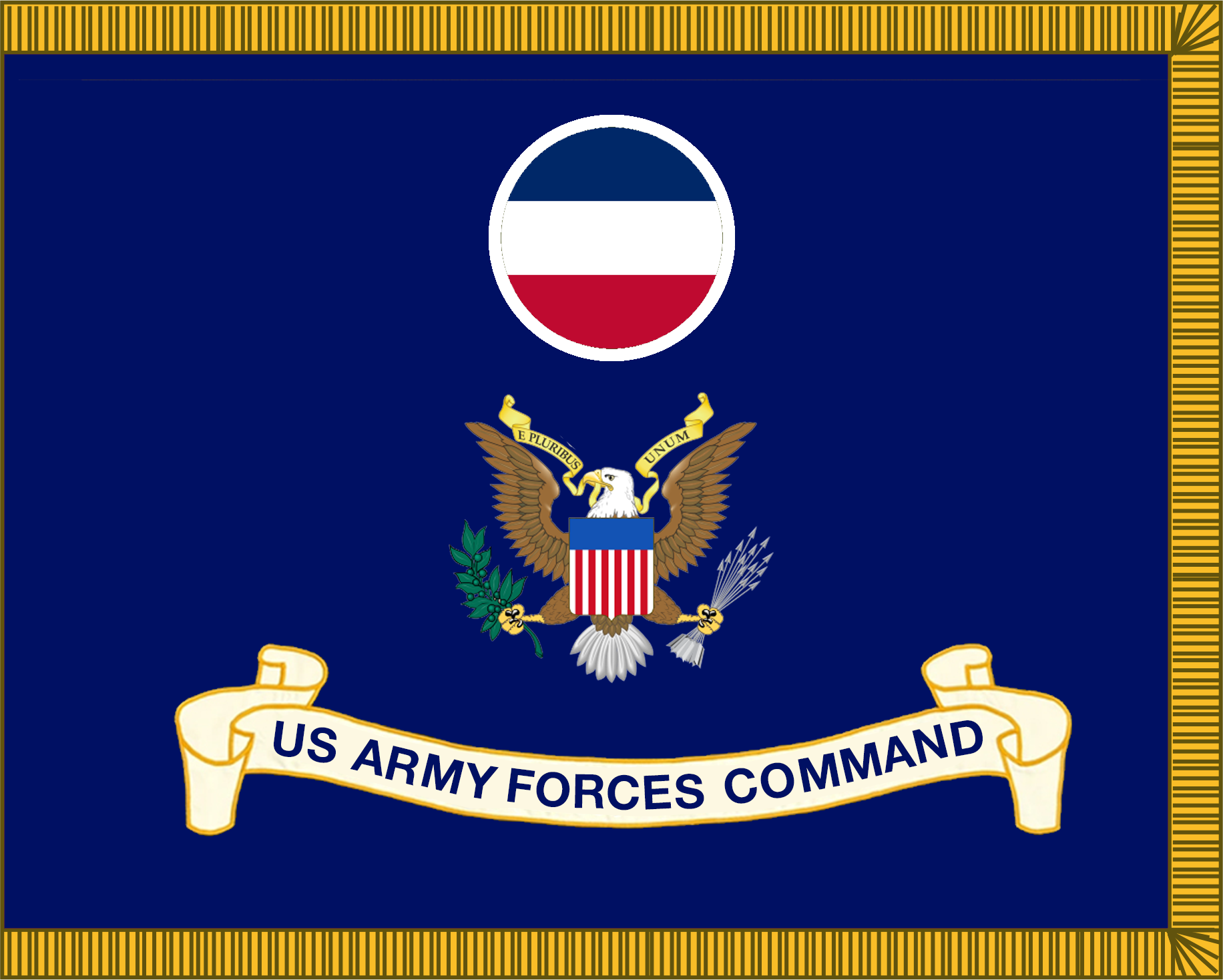
- US Army Forces Command Flag

The United States Army Forces Command (FORSCOM) was the largest command of the United States Army. It provided land forces to the Department of Defense's unified combatant commands. FORSCOM was headquartered at Fort Bragg, North Carolina, and consisted of more than 750,000 active Army, U.S. Army Reserve, and Army National Guard soldiers. It was created on 1 July 1973 from the former Continental Army Command (CONARC), which in turn supplanted Army Field Forces and Army Ground Forces.

FORSCOM was disestablished on 5 December 2025, the same time as the Army stood up U.S. Army Western Hemisphere Command (USAWHC).

== History ==
In 1942, the Army was divided between Army Ground Forces; Army Service Forces; and the Services of Supply.

On 30 August 1945, Army Chief of Staff General George Marshall created a board headed by Lieutenant General Alexander M. Patch to review the organization of the War Department. The board submitted its recommendations to the Chief of Staff on 18 October of the same year. These were that the technical services be continued, with the Transportation Corps made permanent, and that the Finance Department becoming an eighth technical service. The service commands would be abolished, and their functions transferred to the Armies. The Army Service Forces would also be abolished, and its staff sections transferred to the War Department General Staff.

In accordance with these recommendations, on 11 June 1946, Army Service Forces and the nine service commands areas were abolished. The service commands were replaced by six field armies. These six army areas, though similar in name, operated on a functional rather than geographic basis but roughly followed along the old corps area boundaries. Army Ground Forces moved from Washington, D.C. to Fort Monroe.

- First Army, headquartered at Fort Jay in New York, New York included ME, NH, VT, MA, RI, CT, NJ, NY and DE.
- Second Army, headquartered at Baltimore, Maryland included PA, MD, VA, WV, OH, IN and KY.
- Third Army, headquartered variously in rented office space in downtown Atlanta and in 1946 at Fort McPherson in Atlanta, Georgia included NC, SC, GA, FL, AL, TN and MS
- Fourth Army, headquartered at Fort Sam Houston in San Antonio, Texas included TX, AR, LA, OK, and NM.
- Fifth Army, headquartered at Fort Sheridan near Chicago, Illinois included IL, MI, WI, MN, IA, MO, KS, NE, ND, SD, WY and CO.
- Sixth Army, headquartered at Presidio of San Francisco, California included WA, OR, ID, MT, UT, NV and CA.

In March 1948, a large-scale reorganization of the Department of the Army created the Office of the Chief of Army Field Forces (OCAFF) at Fort Monroe and placed the armies and installations in the continental United States directly under departmental control. In late 1950, there was an urgent need to mobilize Army National Guard forces to fight in Korea, and politics had a role to play in how those formations were selected. General Mark W. Clark, Chief of Army Field Forces, selected units for federalization on the bases of training, equipment, and readiness. Geographical distribution loomed large in the minds of those on the Army staff, however, and Clark’s selections were bunched in the East. Only two of the four divisions mobilized, in addition to two regimental combat teams also picked by the staff, appeared on Clark’s original list. Each of the final selections came from the geographical area of one of the six field armies. In partial defense of this decision, the movement of too many divisions from the East Coast would have worsened the existing transport problem. None of the guard units mobilized was up to strength. All of them sought a remedy in last-minute recruiting in the month between their alert and their scheduled federalization on 1 September.

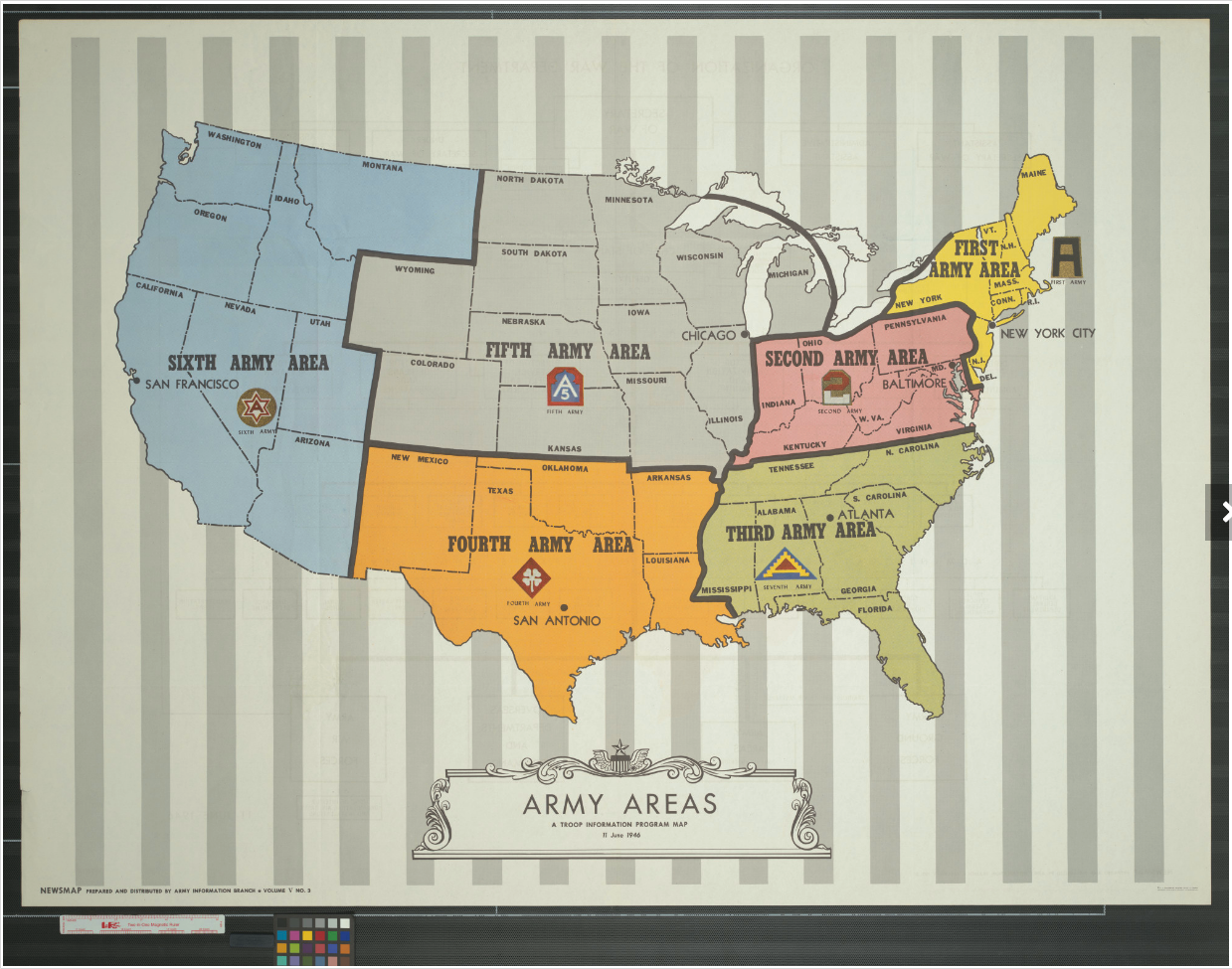
Map of U.S. Army Areas in the continental United States, 11 June 1946

Incomplete training of those already in guard units, combined with the need to train inductee fillers, meant that the National Guard divisions could not be deployed for at least nine months after activation. The ARNG was “clearly not the M-day force it had expected to be,” although it constituted “a substantial part of the available general reserve and was at a generally better level of readiness” than all but one of the few remaining regular divisions.

In 1955, the recommendations of the Davis Committee were implemented, establishing U.S. Continental Army Command (CONARC) to carry out both training and operations.

The Howze Board was the informal name given to the Tactical Mobility Requirements Board created at the direct request of Secretary of Defense Robert McNamara in 1962. In accordance with a letter issued by the CONARC Commanding General, it reviewed and tested new concepts integrating helicopters as close air support into the United States Army. Helicopters had been used during the Korean War to ferry wounded and supplies. Some U.S. combat officers recognized the possibility of using armed helicopters to carry heavy ordnance.

=== Forces Command ===
In 1973, forces in the United States were split between two new commands, U.S. Army Forces Command (FORSCOM) and U.S. Army Training and Doctrine Command (TRADOC). FORSCOM assumed CONARC's responsibility for the command and collective training of all divisions and corps in the continental U.S. and for the installations where they were based. To do this it had the help of various regional numbered army headquarters, First Army, Third Army (until 1974) Fourth Army, Fifth Army, and Sixth Army, at various times. New Army Readiness Regions were created as part of the split, to assist in monitoring and improving the effectiveness of Reserve Component forces.

Formations of Forces Command, 1977

Source: Army Green Book, October 1977

- First United States Army, Fort Meade, MD
- Fifth Army, Fort Sam Houston, TX
- Sixth Army, San Francisco
- III Corps, Fort Hood, TX
- XVIII Airborne Corps, Fort Bragg, NC
- U.S. Army Support Command, Fort Shafter, Hawaii
- 1st Infantry Division, Fort Riley, KS
- 1st Cavalry Division, Fort Hood, TX
- 2nd Armored Division, Fort Hood, Tex.
- 4th Infantry Division, Fort Carson, Colo.
- 5th Infantry Division (Mech.), Fort Polk, La.
- 7th Infantry Division, Fort Ord, Ca.
- 9th Infantry Division, Fort Lewis, Wash.
- 24th Infantry Division, Fort Stewart, GA
- 25th Infantry Division, Schofield Barracks, Hawaii
- 82nd Airborne Division, Fort Bragg, N.C.
- 101st Airborne Division, Fort Campbell, KY
- 6th Air Cavalry Combat Brigade, Fort Hood, Tex.
- 31st Air Defense Artillery Brigade, Homestead, Fla.
- 172nd Infantry Brigade, Fort Richardson, Alaska
- 193rd Infantry Brigade, Fort Amador, Panama Canal Zone
- 194th Armored Brigade, Fort Knox, Ky.
- 197th Infantry Brigade, Fort Benning, Ga.
- 11th Air Defense Artillery Group, Fort Bliss, Tex.
- 3rd Armored Cavalry Regiment, Fort Bliss, Tex
- III Corps Artillery, Fort Sill, Okla.
- Army Readiness Region I, Fort Devens, Mass.
- Army Readiness Region II, Fort Dix, NJ
- Army Readiness Region III, Fort Meade, Maryland
- Army Readiness Region IV, Fort Gillem, Ga.
- Army Readiness Region V, Fort Sheridan, Ill.
- Army Readiness Region VI, Fort Knox, Ky
- Army Readiness Region VII, Fort Sam Houston, Tex.
- Army Readiness Region VIII, Fitzsimons Army Medical Center, Colo.
- Army Readiness Region IX, Presidio of San Francisco, Calif

After reductions on the Korean Peninsula, I Corps had been reduced to zero strength in 1971. In 1980, Fort Lewis was notified of a major change of structure. A corps headquarters was to be activated in March 1982. The new corps headquarters was activated on 1 October 1981, much earlier than expected. On 1 August 1983, the corps expanded its operational control of active Army units to include the 7th Infantry Division (Light) at Fort Ord, and the 172nd Infantry Brigade in Alaska. The brigade in Alaska was expanded into 6th Infantry Division (Light) over the next several years.

In 1987, FORSCOM was given the status of a "specified command", or almost equal to a unified combatant command, with a broad and continuing mission, but composed solely of Army forces. Like the unified commands, the specified commands reported directly to the Joint Chiefs of Staff, instead of their respective service chiefs. Fourth Army cased its colors and was inactivated for the last time in 1991. FORSCOM lost its specified status in 1993.

In October 1994, the United States Army Aviation Center asked the United States Army Force Integration Support Agency (USAFISA) to review the U.S. Army Air Traffic Control Activity. The Army Aviation Center wanted to make sure that its limited air traffic control (ATC) resources were being properly used. USAFISA concluded that the planning of ATC in the mid-1980s, part of creating the then-new Aviation Branch, had never been properly incorporated. ATC skills and services were eroding to the point of endangering aviation safety. As a result, General Eric Shinseki, then the Vice Chief of Staff, approved the concept of a separate command for air traffic services (ATS). On August 28, 2003, Army Traffic Services Command (ATSC) was formally activated and relocated from Fort McPherson to Fort Rucker.

Sixth Army was headquartered at the Presidio of San Francisco. It was eventually inactivated in June 1995. Second Army was inactivated in July 1995.

In 2004, Fifth Army transferred its Reserve Component preparation obligations to First Army, and became responsible for homeland defense and Defense Support of Civil Authorities (DSCA) as United States Army North, the Army Service Component Command of United States Northern Command.

Following the recommendations of the 2005 Base Realignment and Closure Commission, FORSCOM Headquarters moved from Fort McPherson, Georgia to a building at Fort Bragg, North Carolina, in June 2011. The Command hosted a "Casing of the Colors" ceremony on 24 June 2011 at Fort McPherson, and an "Uncasing of Colors" on 1 August 2011 at Fort Bragg.

=== The 2020s and inactivation ===
Before it was disbanded, FORSCOM commanded the United States Army Reserve Command; First Army, and three Active Army corps. With the reformation of V Corps at Fort Know, KY, with the Russian threat building up in Europe, I Corps at Fort Lewis was transferred to United States Army Pacific.

The United States Army Reserve Command was a major subordinate command of FORSCOM. It was headquartered in the same building as FORSCOM at Fort Bragg, N.C. It commanded all United States Army Reserve units in the continental United States, except those assigned to United States Special Operations Command.

First United States Army at Rock Island Arsenal, Illinois, was responsible for training, mobilization and deployment support to Army Reserve and National Guard units in FORSCOM. This mission covers both the Continental United States and Puerto Rico.

In September 2022, Regular Army units and formations in FORSCOM included I Corps at Joint Base Lewis–McChord, Washington; III Corps at Fort Hood, Texas; and XVIII Airborne Corps at Fort Liberty, North Carolina. FORSCOM also includes Army divisions, brigade combat teams and a wide range of additional combat support and combat service support units.

The assigned corps changed with the reactivation of V Corps. Just before the command was disestablished, they were V Corps at Fort Knox; III Corps at Fort Hood, Texas; and XVIII Airborne Corps at Fort Bragg, North Carolina. Together the three corps included nine divisions, 3rd Cavalry Regiment, 37 support brigades of various types, and a range of other corps combat, combat support and combat service support units.

The Army National Guard provides Forces Command eight National Guard combat divisions, 15 brigades, and extensive combat support and combat service support units.

In the early 2020s, FORSCOM Army National Guard strength was approximately 351,000 soldiers. Mobilizing all the Army National Guard into active federal service would bring the total strength of FORSCOM to nearly two-thirds of the Army's combat ground forces.

In late April and early May 2025, the Department of the Army announced the establishment of the United States Army Western Hemisphere Command as part of changes ordered by new Secretary of Defense Pete Hegseth. Effective late 2025, USAWHC absorbed United States Army Forces Command (FORSCOM), United States Army North (ARNORTH), and United States Army South (ARSOUTH) into a single command. From mid-2025 USAWHC became the Army Service Component Command (ASCC) for both United States Northern Command and United States Southern Command assuming all Title 10 responsibilities for U.S. Army activities throughout North America, Latin America and the Caribbean. The merger reduced the number of separate Army major commands and senior generals.

== Commanders ==
The Commanding General of Forces Command (CG FORSCOM) was the head of Forces Command.

General Andrew P. Poppas was the final commanding general.

The Deputy Commanding General is Lieutenant General Stephen G. Smith (since April 2024) and the Command Sergeant Major CSM Nema Mobarakzadeh (Mobar) (since May 2024).

=== Continental Army Command ===
- John E. Dahlquist 1955 - 1956
- Willard G. Wyman March 1956 - September 1958
- Bruce C. Clarke August 1958 - September 1960
- Herbert B. Powell October 1960 - February 1963
- John K. Waters March 1963 - April 1964
- Hugh P. Harris March 1964 - 1965
- Paul L. Freeman Jr. 1965 - June 1967
- James K. Woolnough July 1967 - October 1970
- Ralph E. Haines Jr. November 1970 - January 1973
- Walter T. Kerwin Jr. February 1973

Resdesignated United States Army Forces Command in 1973

=== Forces Command ===
No.	Commanding General		Term		
No.	Portrait	Name	Took office	Left office	Term length
1	Walter T. Kerwin Jr.	General; Walter T. Kerwin Jr. (1917–2008)	1 July 1973	1974	~ 184 days
2	Bernard W. Rogers	General; Bernard W. Rogers (1921–2008)	1974	1976	~ 2 years, 0 days
3	Frederick J. Kroesen Jr.	General; Frederick J. Kroesen Jr. (1923–2020)	1976	1978	~ 2 years, 0 days
4	Robert M. Shoemaker	General; Robert M. Shoemaker (1924–2017)	1978	1982	~ 4 years, 0 days
5	Richard E. Cavazos	General; Richard E. Cavazos (1929–2017)	1982	1984	~ 2 years, 0 days
6	Robert W. Sennewald	General; Robert W. Sennewald (1929–2023)	1984	1986	~ 2 years, 0 days
7	Joseph T. Palastra Jr.	General; Joseph T. Palastra Jr. (1931–2015)	1986	1989	~ 3 years, 0 days
8	Colin L. Powell	General; Colin L. Powell (1937–2021)	4 April 1989	27 September 1989	176 days
9	Edwin H. Burba Jr.	General; Edwin H. Burba Jr. (born 1936)	27 September 1989	1993	~ 3 years, 96 days
10	Dennis J. Reimer	General; Dennis J. Reimer (born 1939)	1993	1995	~ 2 years, 0 days
11	John H. Tilelli Jr.	General; John H. Tilelli Jr. (born 1941)	1995	1996	~ 1 year, 0 days
12	David A. Bramlett	General; David A. Bramlett (born 1941)	1 July 1996	31 July 1998	2 years, 30 days
13	Thomas A. Schwartz	General; Thomas A. Schwartz (born 1945)	31 July 1998	23 November 1999	1 year, 115 days
14	John W. Hendrix	General; John W. Hendrix (born 1942)	23 November 1999	19 November 2001	1 year, 361 days
15	Larry R. Ellis	General; Larry R. Ellis (born 1946)	19 November 2001	6 May 2004	2 years, 169 days
16	Dan K. McNeill	General; Dan K. McNeill (born 1946)	7 May 2004	8 January 2007	2 years, 246 days
17	Charles C. Campbell	General; Charles C. Campbell (1948–2016)	9 January 2007	2 June 2010	3 years, 144 days
18	James D. Thurman	General; James D. Thurman (born 1953)	3 June 2010	7 July 2011	1 year, 34 days
-	Howard B. Bromberg	Lieutenant General; Howard B. Bromberg; Acting	8 July 2011	11 September 2011	65 days
19	David M. Rodriguez	General; David M. Rodriguez (born 1954)	12 September 2011	15 March 2013	1 year, 184 days
20	Daniel B. Allyn	General; Daniel B. Allyn (born 1959)	10 May 2013	14 August 2014	1 year, 96 days
21	Mark A. Milley	General; Mark A. Milley (born 1958)	15 August 2014	9 August 2015	359 days
22	Robert B. Abrams	General; Robert B. Abrams (born 1960)	10 August 2015	16 October 2018	3 years, 67 days
-	Laura J. Richardson	Lieutenant General; Laura J. Richardson (born 1963); Acting	17 October 2018	20 March 2019	154 days
23	Michael X. Garrett	General; Michael X. Garrett (born 1961)	21 March 2019	8 July 2022	3 years, 109 days
24	Andrew P. Poppas	General; Andrew P. Poppas (born c. 1966)	8 July 2022	5 December 2025	3 years, 150 days
