= Tony Cucolo =

Anthony A. Cucolo III
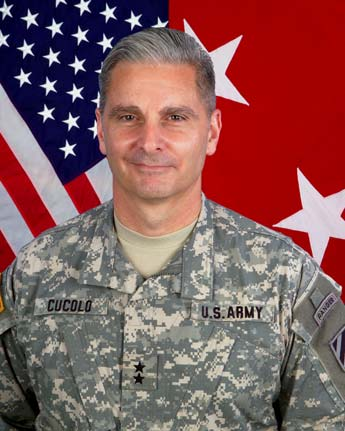
- Born: August 22, 1957 (age 69)
- Military career
- Allegiance: United States of America
- Branch: United States Army
- Service years: 1979-2014
- Rank: Major General
- Nickname: Tony
- Commands: 3rd Infantry Division; US Army War College
- Conflicts: Yugoslav Wars; War in Afghanistan; Iraq War
- Other work: Associate vice chancellor for leadership and veterans' programs, University of Texas System

Anthony Arthur "Tony" Cucolo (born August 22, 1957) is a retired United States Army Major General. He was notable for his service as the Army's Chief of Public Affairs, commander of the 3rd Infantry Division and Fort Stewart/Hunter Army Airfield, Georgia, and commandant of the Army War College at Carlisle Barracks, Pennsylvania.

== Early life ==
Cucolo was born in Suffern, New York on August 22, 1957. Cucolo's grandfather, Anthony Sr. (1897–1983) was an immigrant from Italy who rose from laborer to president of a half dozen companies involved in the construction business. The senior Anthony Cucolo also served as a captain in the U.S. Army's Engineer branch during World War II. Anthony Cucolo III's uncle Belmonte Cucolo (1920–2005) and father Anthony A. Cucolo Jr. both attended the United States Military Academy, graduating in January 1943 and June 1946, respectively. Belmonte Cucolo served in the Pacific theater during World War II and attained the rank of captain before leaving the Army in 1947. Anthony Cucolo Jr. served in Korea during the Korean War, and attained the rank of captain in the Infantry branch before resigning in 1954.

Anthony Cucolo III graduated from New York City's Xavier High School in 1975, and is a 1979 graduate of the United States Military Academy. He was commissioned a Second Lieutenant of infantry in 1979.

== Start of career ==
Cucolo served primarily in infantry and armor divisions. He commanded two companies and was an operations officer (S-3) at both the battalion and brigade level. He commanded an infantry battalion in Germany and deployed his unit as a combined arms task force for the first eleven months of the Balkans NATO Implementation Force (IFOR) in the contested area of Brčko, Bosnia. Cucolo also commanded 3rd Brigade, 3rd Infantry Division

== Career as general officer ==
Assistant Division Commander for the 10th Mountain Division, Fort Drum, New York. While in this capacity, he deployed to Afghanistan for Operation Enduring Freedom and served as Deputy Commanding General, CJTF-180, during the 10th Mountain Division's service there in 2003–2004.

Cucolo's other Joint assignments include duty with the Joint Staff at the Pentagon from July 2001 to July 2003, with service in the Strategy and Policy Directorate (J5), Chief of the Future Operations Group in the Operations Directorate (J3) immediately after 9/11, and then Chief of European and NATO Policy, J5. His most recent joint assignment was as Director, Joint Center for Operational Analysis, US Joint Forces Command, from September 2004 through May 2006. In that time, Cucolo deployed to Iraq and Afghanistan multiple times, embedding in joint operational headquarters there, as well as duty with JTF-Katrina to develop the lessons learned from civil support operations in the U.S. Gulf Coast region. Cucolo's next assignment was a two-year tour in the Pentagon as the Chief of Public Affairs for the United States Army. On 14 July 2008, Cucolo took over command of the 3rd Infantry Division, leading them to their fourth deployment to Iraq.

While deployed to Iraq as Commanding General of the 3rd ID, Cucolo implemented a controversial order for soldiers of Multi-National Force-North on 4 November 2009. This new policy prohibited "becoming nondeployable for reasons within the control of the soldier," including "becoming pregnant or impregnating a soldier, while assigned to the Task Force Marne AOR, resulting in the redeployment of the pregnant soldier." Cucolo made the rule part of General Order No. 1. While violation of any rules in the general order could lead to court-martial, Cucolo insisted that he never intended such a drastic punishment for pregnancy. That section of General Order Number 1 was rescinded by GEN Ray Odierno, effective 1 January 2010.

On 15 April 2011, after 33 months as the Division Commander, Cucolo passed command of the 3rd Infantry Division to Robert B. "Abe" Abrams. Cucolo then spent a year in the Pentagon as the Director of Force Development, G-8, on the Army Staff, and was co-chair of the $35B equipment program execution group, the Army equipment budget for everything from rifles and uniforms to tanks and multi-year helicopter programs.

In June 2012 Cucolo assumed command of the Army War College at Carlisle Barracks Pennsylvania.

In March 2014 William E. Rapp was announced as Cucolo's successor, and in June 2014 Cucolo relinquished command and retired to Texas, transitioning from the service in September 2014.

== Post-military career ==
In May 2015 Cucolo was announced as the University of Texas System's new associate vice chancellor for leadership and veterans' programs. While at UT System (8 universities, 6 medical institutions, 221,000 students and 110,00 employees), he helped build the System's strategic plan, created and led leadership development programs for faculty, staff, and students, served as the Chancellor's liaison to the Faculty Advisory Council, and supported veterans programs across the System's 14 institutions. In the Spring and Summer of 2018, Cucolo assisted the Austin Chamber of Commerce in the competition for the location selection of the new US Army Futures Command. Austin was selected as home to the new headquarters from more than 32 other cities, and Cucolo received a Volunteer of the Year Award from the Austin Chamber in 2019 for his work. Cucolo departed the UT System in September 2019. He currently co-chairs the National Security Innovation Council, a state-wide business, academic and entrepreneur consortium that accelerates the linkage of problem solving capability in Texas with problem owners in the national security community. Additionally, he is on the Board of Directors of Texas 2036, a public policy think tank founded by Dallas attorney Tom Luce. Cucolo is on the roster of US Army "highly qualified experts" and leads or supports several US Army leadership development programs as a senior mentor each year, a role he assumed shortly after transition. He also owns Triple-A Bar None, (AAA-0), a leadership consulting company and conducts leadership development programs with private and public sector organizations.

== Personal life ==
Cucolo is married to the former Evanthia Magni of Athens, Greece. They live and work between Texas and Greece.

During Cucolo's deployment to Iraq he was among many high-ranking officers who has become the target of several impersonators. This included many fake social networking and dating service accounts. The victims were initially contacted on Skype and then lured to the fraudulent accounts.
