= Lower Babur =

Village in southern Afghanistan

Lower Babur (Pashto: کښته بابر) is a village in the Arghandab District of Kandahar Province in southern Afghanistan that was destroyed by American military forces in October and November 2010.

In the Autumn of 2010, the United States Army launched Operation Dragon Strike in Kandahar as a part of U.S. President Barack Obama's broader troop surge strategy in Afghanistan. After experiencing high casualties in Arghandab, Lt. Col. David S. Flynn of the American 1-320th field artillery, a part of the 101st Airborne Division, ordered villagers in some villages to diffuse IEDs or leave their villages, which would be destroyed by aerial bombardment. Flynn maintained that villagers knew the location of IEDs; some villagers later stated that they would coordinate with insurgents to travel safely along certain paths at certain hours of the day.

Flynn later explained that the villages were empty of people and full of IEDs, a claim repeated by The New York Times. Villagers near Lower Babur disputed this account during interviews with IPS, explaining that they had evacuated their homes prior to the American offensive, but returned regularly to tend to their properties.

Few media sources describe the destruction of Lower Babur specifically. Arghandab District governor Shah Muhammed Ahmadi reported that 6 villages had been destroyed, with his assent and the agreement of their inhabitants. In April 2011, Bob Strong of Reuters reported that "a walk through what was once the village of lower Babur revealed a narrow strip of rubble surrounded by orchards and forest on both sides, testimony to the force of U.S. bombing." Strong noted that the village mosque had been rebuilt. In August 2011, Sean Martin reported that 20 small houses had been "rebuilt" by the "Kandahar Provincial Reconstruction Team." Afghans had not yet moved back into their village.

== See also ==
- Operation Dragon Strike
- Tarok Kolache
- Khosrow Sofla
- Arghandab District
- Kandahar Province
