= Khosrow Sofla =

Former village in Kandahar, Afghanistan

Khosrow Sofla (Pashto: خسرو صوفیا) was a village in the Arghandab District of Kandahar Province in southern Afghanistan that was demolished by the United States Army in October and November 2010. After experiencing high casualties resulting from firefights and improvised explosive devices (IEDs) outside the village, Lieutenant Colonel David S. Flynn of the American 1-320th field artillery, a part of the 101st Airborne Division, ordered villagers to evacuate Khosrow Sofla, Khosrow Ulya, Tarok Kolache, and Lower Babur and used aerial bombardment to partially or wholly destroy the villages.

== Background ==
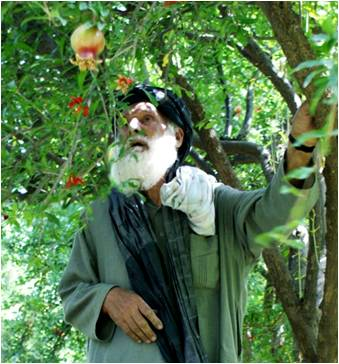
Fruit farmer in Arghandab District, near Khosrow Sofla

In 2010, American President Barack Obama's policy of "troop surge" brought an additional 30,000 American soldiers to Afghanistan, and led to a more than two-fold increase in airstrikes, Predator drone strikes, insurgent casualties, and a six-fold increase in special forces operations. American military officials decided to follow their widely publicized offensive in Marja, Helmand Province, with an effort to seize territories in adjacent Kandahar Province. American forces dubbed their offensive "Operation Dragon Strike," and referred to Kandahar as "The Heart of Darkness" because of resistance to American and NATO presence there.

Following substantial military engagements between U.S. Army and Afghan Taliban forces outside Khosrow Sofla in the summer and fall of 2010, villagers were ordered by American military officials to defuse IEDs in the village before 28 October, or have the village destroyed.

During interviews after the destruction of the Khosrow Sofla and other villages, villagers stated that they had agreed with local Taliban upon what paths and hours of the day would be safe for travel.

== Destruction ==
In mid-November 2010, Arghandab District governor Shah Muhammed Ahmadi reported that every one of Khosrow Sofla's 40 homes had been destroyed by 25 missiles. Ahmadi also said that the destruction of 120-130 homes in his district had been agreed upon by their occupants, and listed 6 other villages that were destroyed "to make them safe." The New York Times reported that hundreds or thousands of homes and farms throughout Kandahar were destroyed in late 2010 "using armored bulldozers, high explosives, missiles and even airstrikes." The Zhari and Panjwayi Districts in Kandahar were also the site of home demolitions, where American forces often built roads through houses and farms in order to bypass IEDs. According to journalists embedded with the American army, American forces have used an "impressive" array of methods to "not only to demolish homes, but also to eliminate tree lines where insurgents could hide, blow up outbuildings, flatten agricultural walls, and carve new "military roads."

Mine-clearing line charges and HIMARS artillery rocket systems were also used extensively to destroy houses.

== Reactions and controversy ==
The offensive in Kandahar and associated home and farm demolitions were opposed by local leaders, and caused resentment among Afghans who fled the offensive or remained in their villages. Other tactics causing anger among local people included night raids and mass arrests in villages from which American forces received small arms fire. Brigadier General Nick Carter, British commander of US-NATO troops in southern Afghanistan, supported the demolitions policy, as did American Lt. Gen. James L. Terry and general David Petraeus, who argued that the policy was forced on NATO by the Taliban.

The scale of destruction in Khosrow Sofla has been contested, with one article from The New York Times reporting that "only 10 compounds and orchards were damaged." The New York Times has also maintained that most houses and compounds destroyed were previously abandoned. These claims have been contested by other journalists, photographs, villagers, and by reports of evictions prior to, and damage claims following village demolitions.

Villagers interviewed by Inter Press Service stated that they had left their homes anticipating the American offensive, but returned to tend to them regularly in coordination with the Taliban. Villagers also rejected claims by the American military and some American media services that their villages were saturated with IEDs. Soldiers assigned to the area after the destruction report that they found upwards of 500 IED’s and anti-personnel mines both emplaced and cached within buildings in the village however, as well as an IED factory in the partially collapsed mosque. The IED threat was so severe that a EOD team was assigned to clear roads and pathways inside the village for more than a week.

Spencer Ackerman of Wired Magazine reported that the local leader or malek of Khosrow Sofla was assassinated by the Taliban after the village's destruction.

== See also ==
- Operation Dragon Strike
- Tarok Kolache
- Lower Babur
- Arghandab District
- Kandahar Province
