= Robert B. Abrams =

US Army general

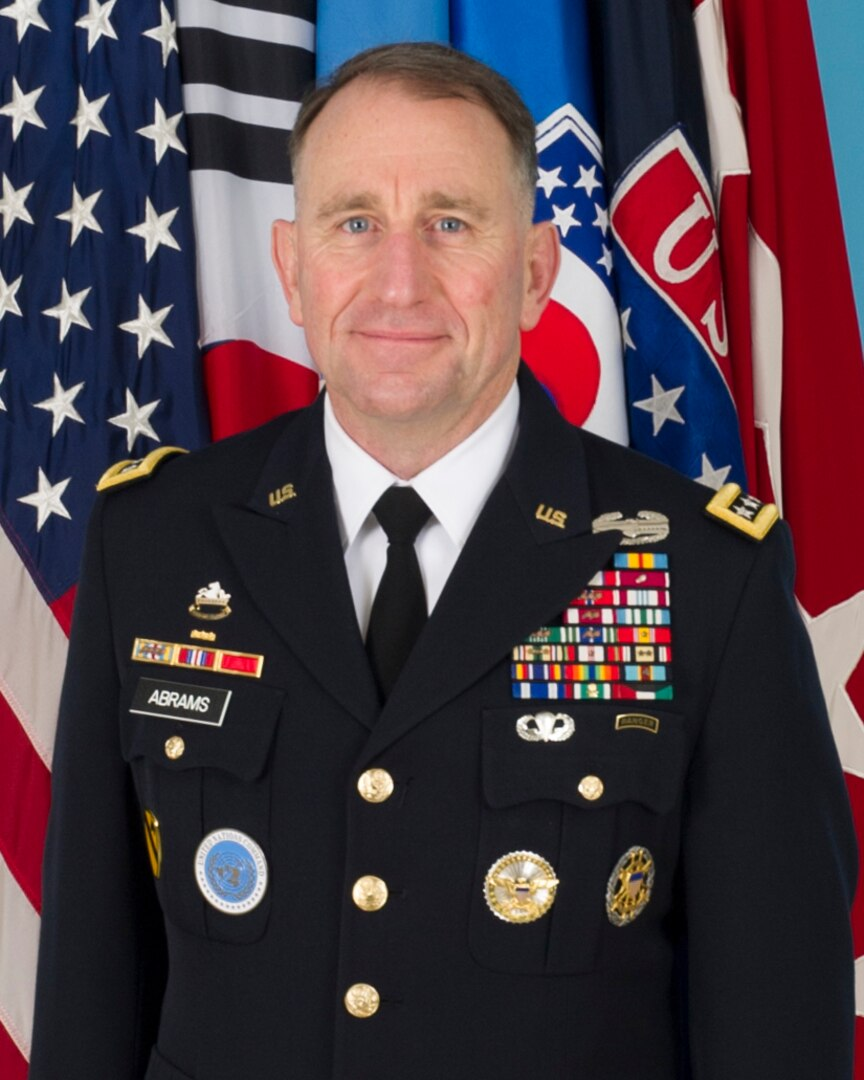
- Official portrait, 2018
- Born: November 18, 1960 (age 65); West Germany (present-day Germany)
- Spouse: Connie C. Clevenger (m. 1992)
- Relatives: General Creighton W. Abrams Jr. (father); Brigadier General Creighton W. Abrams III (brother); General John N. Abrams (brother)
- Military career
- Allegiance: United States
- Branch: United States Army
- Service years: 1982–2021
- Rank: General
- Nickname: Abe
- Commands: United Nations Command; United States Forces Korea; Combined Forces Command; United States Army Forces Command; 3rd Infantry Division; Fort Irwin National Training Center; 1st Brigade, 1st Cavalry Division; 1st Battalion, 8th Cavalry Regiment
- Conflicts: Gulf War; Iraq War; War in Afghanistan
- Awards: Defense Distinguished Service Medal (2); Army Distinguished Service Medal (2); Legion of Merit (6); Bronze Star Medal (4)

Robert Bruce Abrams (born 18 November 1960) is a retired four-star general in the United States Army who last served as the commander of United States Forces Korea. He concurrently served as the commander of United Nations Command and commander of R.O.K.-U.S. Combined Forces Command. He previously served as the 22nd commanding general of United States Army Forces Command from 10 August 2015 to 17 October 2018. He was a 1982 graduate of the United States Military Academy where he was commissioned as an armor officer. During his years of active service, he has held command and staff positions across the Army and joint community in Germany, the United States, Southwest Asia and South Korea. Abrams comes from a family of career military officers. His father was former Army Chief of Staff General Creighton W. Abrams Jr., and both of his elder brothers, Creighton and John, were Army general officers.

He relinquished command of United States Command, Combined Forces Command and United States Forces Korea to General Paul LaCamera on 2 July 2021 and retired soon after.

== Assignments ==
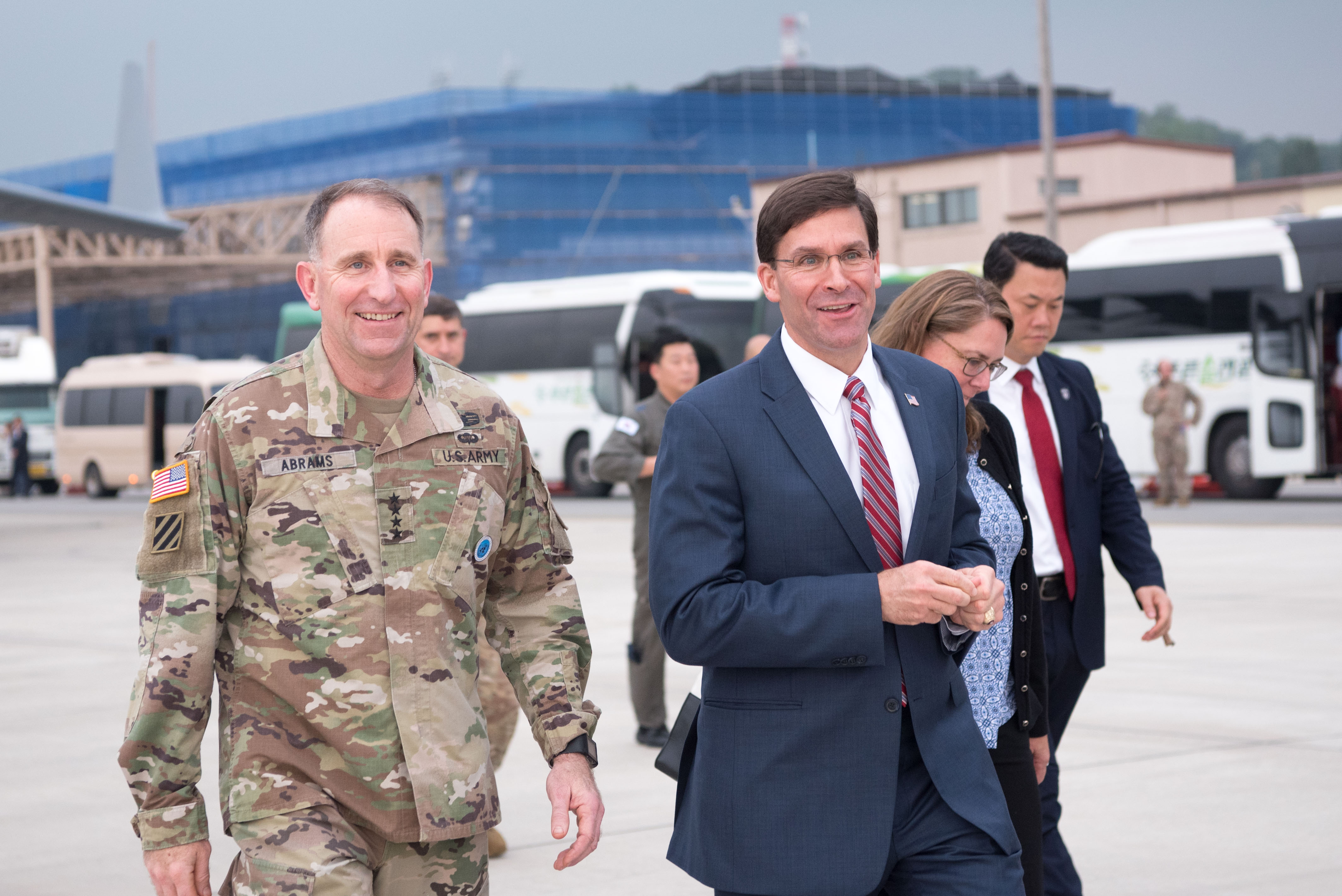
Abrams (left) with US Secretary of Defense Mark Esper in 2019

Abrams' tours of duty with war-fighting units include the 3rd Armored Division as a lieutenant; the 1st Cavalry Division as a captain, and as a major in the 3rd Cavalry Regiment (United States), as a lieutenant colonel (including battalion command and as the Division G3) and colonel (including command of a brigade combat team and as the division chief of staff). His joint experience includes serving as a Strategic War Planner for the Chairman of the Joint Chiefs of Staff with responsibility for the United States Central Command's Area of Operations; and as the Director of the Joint Center of Excellence for IED Defeat, a subordinate of the Joint Improvised-Threat Defeat Organization (JIDA).

== Commands ==
Abrams has commanded at every level from company through divisional command. His first command was of D Company and Headquarters and Headquarters Company, 1st Battalion, 8th Cavalry Regiment. He deployed the company in support of Operations Desert Shield and Desert Storm. Abrams's next command assignment was at battalion level, with 1st Battalion, 8th Cavalry Regiment, 1st Cavalry Division.

Later, Abrams served as the commander of the 1st Brigade Combat Team (Iron Horse), 1st Cavalry Division, where he deployed to East Baghdad in support of Operation Iraqi Freedom II, as commanding general of Fort Irwin & the National Training Center, and most recently as commanding general of the 3rd Infantry Division at Fort Stewart, Georgia from 2011 to 2013, during which he served as commander of Regional Command South in Kandahar.

Abrams has extensive operational experience, having served as an operations officer at squadron, regimental and divisional level. Abrams has also served as an instructor, written doctrine and developed training at the United States Army Armor School, and as executive officer to the Commanding General United States Army Europe and Africa and Seventh Army.

Abrams's general officer assignments also include service as the Deputy Commanding General, Combined Arms Center-Training, Fort Leavenworth and the commander of the Fort Irwin National Training Center at Fort Irwin National Training Center.

In 2015, Abrams was assigned as Commanding General, United States Army Forces Command, which oversees all United States Army combat units in the continental United States.

On 11 October 2018, the Senate confirmed his nomination to command United States Forces Korea. Abrams relinquished command of Army Forces Command to his deputy commander, Lieutenant General Laura Richardson, on 16 October, and assumed command of United States Forces Korea from General Vincent K. Brooks on 7 November.

In 2020, Abrams was among the candidates shortlisted to replace Admiral Philip S. Davidson as the commander of United States Indo-Pacific Command, but Admiral John C. Aquilino was nominated instead.

In May 2021, Abrams was bestowed the Korean name Woo Byung-soo (Note: In this Korean name, the family name is Woo.) (Korean: 우병수) by the ROK-US Alliance Friendship Association in honor of "his contributions to the alliance and defense of South Korea".

His retirement ceremony was held on 31 August 2021.

== Education ==
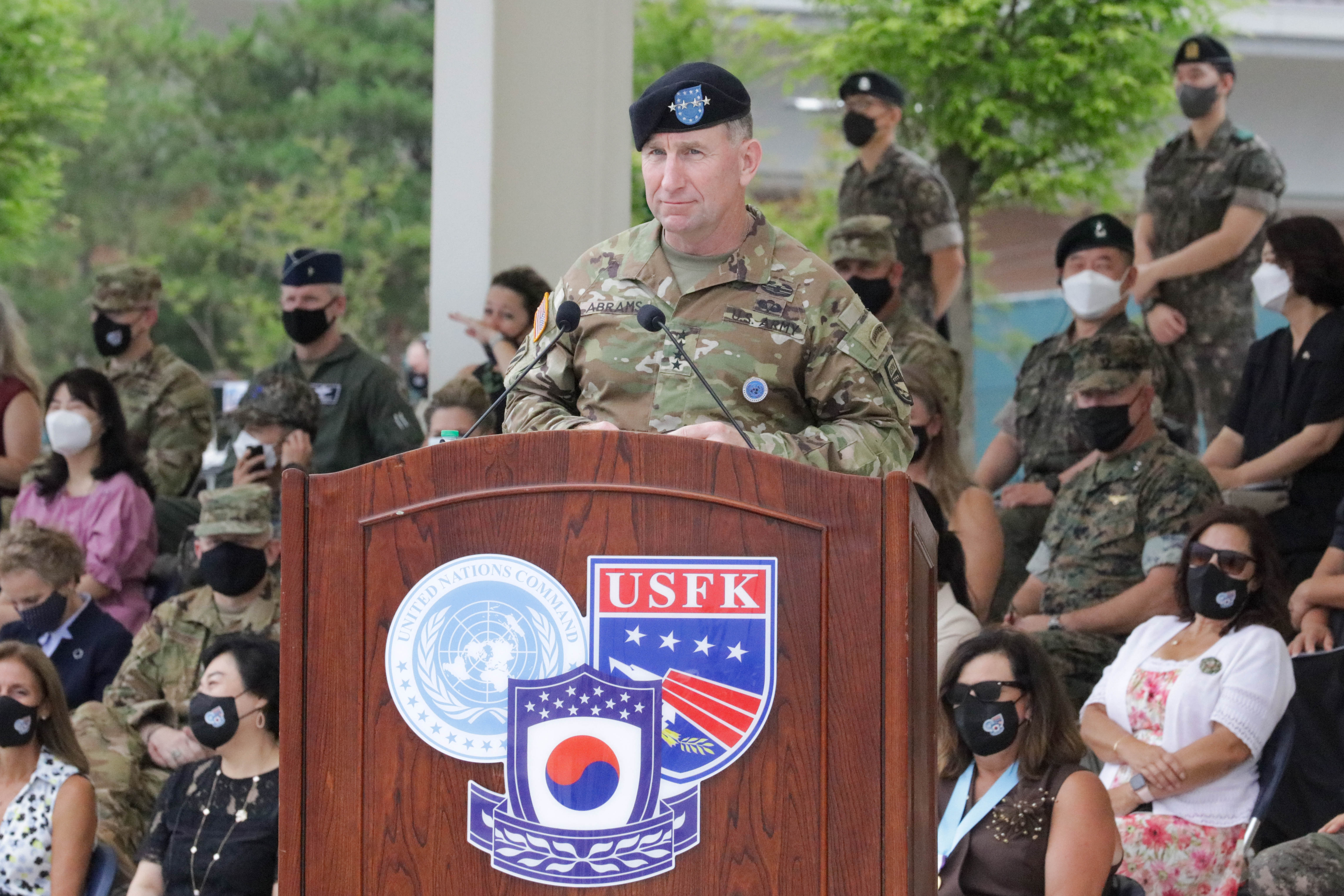
Abrams gives farewell remarks during the United Nations Command, Combined Forces Command, and U.S. Forces Korea change of command ceremony on 2 July 2021 at Barker Field.

Abrams holds a Bachelor of Science degree from the United States Military Academy, a Master of Science in Administration from Central Michigan University, and a master's degree in Strategic Studies from the United States Army War College.

His military schooling includes the Armor Basic [Cavalry] and Advanced Courses, Basic Airborne Course, Ranger School [Class 5–83], the Combined Arms and Services Staff School, the United States Army Command and General Staff College, and the Army War College.

== Awards and decorations ==
Medals and awards earned by Abrams include:

Combat Action Badge

Personal Awards
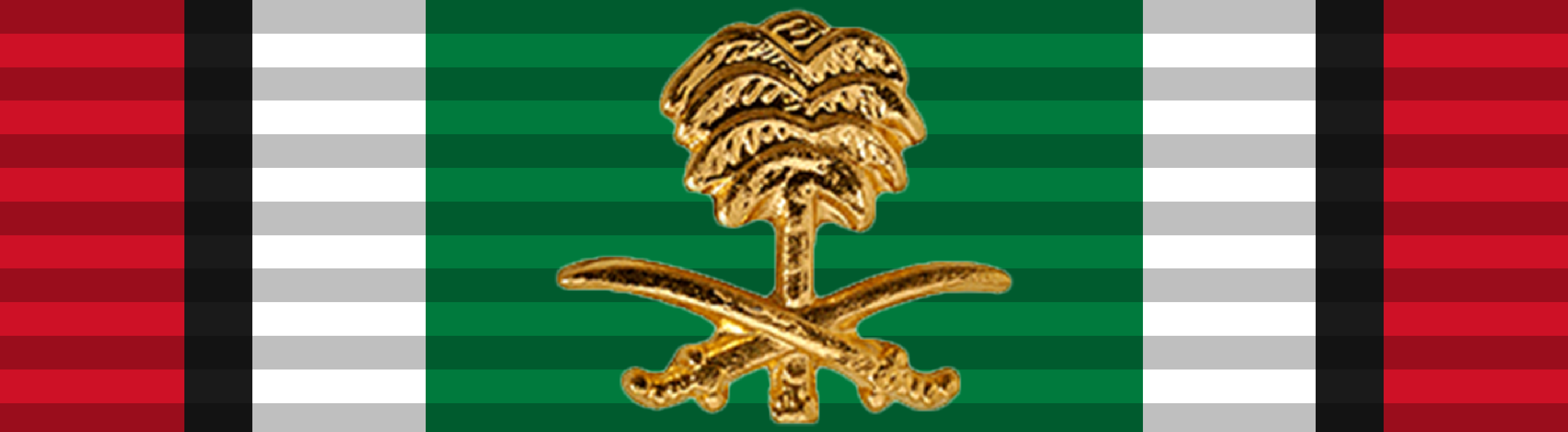

Defense Distinguished Service Medal w/ bronze oak leaf cluster	Army Distinguished Service Medal w/ bronze oak leaf cluster

Legion of Merit w/ one silver oak leaf cluster	Bronze Star Medal w/ three bronze oak leaf clusters	Defense Meritorious Service Medal
Meritorious Service Medal w/ two oak leaf clusters	Commendation Medal	Commendation Medal w/ three oak leaf clusters
Achievement Medal w/ two oak leaf clusters	National Defense Service Medal w/ one bronze service star	Southwest Asia Service Medal w/ three bronze campaign stars
Afghanistan Campaign Medal w/ one campaign star	Iraq Campaign Medal w/ two campaign stars	Global War on Terrorism Service Medal
Army Service Ribbon	Army Overseas Service Ribbon w/ bronze award numeral 4	NATO Medal for Service with ISAF
Order of National Security Merit (1st Grade)	Kuwait Liberation Medal (Saudi Arabia)	Kuwait Liberation Medal (Kuwait)

Unit Awards

Joint Meritorious Unit Award w/ 4 oak leaf clusters	Valorous Unit Award	Meritorious Unit Commendation

Identification and service badges
8th Cavalry Regiment Distinctive unit insignia	Basic Parachutist Badge	Ranger tab
1st Cavalry Division Combat Service Identification Badge	Office of the Secretary of Defense Identification Badge	Joint Chiefs of Staff

United Nations Command Badge	4 Overseas Service Bars

== Notes ==
Military offices
Preceded by Dana J. H. Pittard	Commanding General of the Fort Irwin National Training Center; 2009-2011	Succeeded by Terry R. Ferrell
Preceded by Tony Cucolo	Commanding General of the 3rd Infantry Division; 2011–2013	Succeeded by John M. Murray
Preceded by Thomas D. Waldhauser	Senior Military Assistant to the Secretary of Defense; 2013–2015	Succeeded by Ronald F. Lewis
Preceded by Mark A. Milley	Commanding General of United States Army Forces Command; 2015–2018	Succeeded by Michael X. Garrett
Preceded by Vincent K. Brooks	Commander of United Nations Command; Commander of United States Forces Korea; Commander of ROK/US Combined Forces Command; 2018–2021	Succeeded by Paul LaCamera
