= Operation Dragon Strike =

NATO counter-insurgent mission in Kandahar province, Afghanistan

- Part of the War in Afghanistan (2001–2021)
Date	September 15, 2010 – December 31, 2010
Location	Kandahar province, Afghanistan
Result	Coalition Victory

Belligerents
United States; Canada; Islamic Republic of Afghanistan	(Afghanistan) Taliban

Casualties and losses
(United States) 34 killed (Canada) 1 killed (Afghanistan) 7+ policemen killed	Heavy

Operation Dragon Strike was a NATO counter-insurgent mission in Kandahar province, Afghanistan, against Taliban forces, which started on September 15, 2010.

== Planning ==
The aim of the operation was to reclaim the strategic southern province of Kandahar, which was the birthplace of the Taliban movement. The area where the operation took place has been dubbed "The Heart of Darkness" by Coalition troops.

The basic concept of the coalition operation, code-named Dragon Strike, was a series of sequential, mutually reinforcing attacks across the entire district to seize control of key nodes and movement corridors in the enemy system, and destroy enemy strongholds and IED and weapons facilitation networks. By advancing simultaneously across the district, ISAF (International Security Assistance Force) and ANSF (Afghan National Security Forces) forced the Taliban to simultaneously defend multiple positions.

== Battles ==
The first in a series of decisive attacks across the entire district began in the early morning hours of September 15, 2010. But in the months preceding Dragon Strike, Afghan and coalition special forces had conducted shaping operations in Zhari. Many of these were kill or capture operations against insurgent leadership in Zhari, which successfully removed numerous Taliban commanders, IEDcell leaders, and facilitators. 195 Successful targeted missions continued while ISAF battle-space owners advanced through the district. In mid-October 2010, ISAF killed both of the Taliban's field commanders for Zhari, Kaka Abdul Khaliq and his deputy Kako.

The main force leading the operation were units from the 101st Airborne Division. Some of the heaviest of the fighting during the operation had been in the Zhari District, which is on the main highway to Kandahar and a major insurgent supply route into the city, the Arghandab District and the Panjwaye District.

By the end of December 2010, the operation's main objectives had been accomplished. The majority of Taliban forces in Kandahar had withdrawn from the province, and much of their leadership was said to have been fractured.

The operation has also drawn large criticism from the local civilian population because of claims of heavy-handed tactics by the U.S. military. During October, U.S. troops destroyed hundreds of Afghan civilian homes, farm houses, walls, trees and plowed through fields and buildings using explosives, bulldozers, aerial bombardment and rocketry in Zhari, Panjwayi and Arghandab districts. Photographs revealed one village, Tarok Kolache, to have been totally destroyed by aerial bombing, while several other villages including Khosrow Sofla, Khosrow Ulya, and Lower Babur were reported destroyed by journalists working in the area. The governor of Arghandab District reported additional villages to have been destroyed. Lt. Col. David Flynn told reporters that villagers knew the locations of IEDs, and were given the option of removing them to prevent their villages from being destroyed. Military officials later stated that most of the farms, orchards and buildings destroyed had been booby-trapped by the Taliban. Also, they argued that the destruction was positive in that it would force Afghan residents to go to their local government center for compensation, seeing this as a way to connect the civilian population to the Afghan government.

In late December, the civilians, displaced by the fighting, had started to go back to their homes only to find them destroyed. The damages caused by Coalition troops to civilian property were estimated to be more than 100 million dollars by two separate bodies within the Afghan government. Of that sum, Coalition forces agreed to pay approximately 5 million.

== Alleged Iranian Involvement ==
The US and NATO have accused Iran of attempting to destabilize Afghanistan, while Iran has denied supporting militant groups. On 24 December 2010 it was reported that an officer from the elite Quds Force of the Iranian Revolutionary Guards Corps, was captured by U.S. Special Forces on December 18, a NATO spokesman said. Described as "a key Taliban weapons facilitator", he was arrested in Nor Muhammaed Koloche, in Kandahar province. It was the first reported capture of an al-Quds Force officer in Afghanistan. The joint security team specifically targeted the individual for facilitating the movement of weapons between Iran and Kandahar through Nimroz province. The ISAF later released a statement that the man captured was not a member of al-Quds, but declined to comment on his nationality.

== Operational Forces ==
- 101st Airborne Division, 2nd Brigade Combat Team "STRIKE"
  - 1-502 Infantry Regiment
  - 1-75 Cavalry Regiment
  - 2-502 Infantry Regiment
  - 2nd Brigade Special Troops Battalion
  - 1-320 Field Artillery Regiment
  - 526 Brigade Support Battalion
  - 1st Brigade Special Troops Battalion (A Co, 2nd Platoon) (attachment)
- 2d Platoon 723d EOD 184th OD BN (EOD)
- A Co 431st Civil Affairs BN (attached)
- 101st Airborne Division, 3rd Brigade Combat Team "RAKKASAN"
- 3d Squadron 2d Cavalry Regiment (Stryker)
- 416th TEC, 372nd EN BD, 416 EN BN, 863 EN BN (Attached)
  - 428th Engineer Company (Combat)
- 864th EN BN (Construction Effects) (General Support)
  - 23rd EN CO (Sapper) (Airborne)
  - 3d Platoon 53D OD CO (EOD)
  - 557th EN CO (Horizontal)
    - 994th EN CO (Combat Heavy) (VERTICAL) (Attached)
  - 84th EN DET (S&D)
  - 28th EN DET (Conc)
  - 211th EN DET (Conc)
  - NMCB 21 DET Kandahar (USNR) (US Navy Seabees)
  - NMCB 18 (USNR) (US Navy Seabees)
- 1st Battalion, The Royal Canadian Regiment
- ANA Kandak, 3rd BDD of the 205th Corps
- Blackhawk CO.1 -22 1BCT 4ID
- 1-71 RSTA 1st BCT 10th Mountain
- 1-66 AR, 1st BCT, 4th ID
- 1-4 Attack Recon Battalion, 4th ID

== See also ==
- Arghandab District
- Kandahar Province
- Tarok Kolache
- Khosrow Sofla
- Lower Babur
