= Tarok Kolache =

Former settlement in Afghanistan

Coordinates: 31°41′59″N 65°39′40″E

Tarok Kolache (Pashto: تاروک کولاچې) was a small settlement in Kandahar province, Afghanistan.

On October 6, 2010, Lieutenant Colonel David Flynn, commander of the Combined Joint Task Force 1-320th gave the order to drop 49,200 pounds (22,300 kg) of rockets and aerial bombs on the village which resulted in leveling the village completely. Col. Flynn stated that Tarok Kolache was one of three southern Afghanistan villages that the Taliban were using as bomb-making factories.

== See also ==
- Deh Bala wedding party bombing
- Bến Tre
- Khosrow Sofla
- Lower Babur
- Kandahar Province
