= 4th Battalion =

4th Battalion may refer to:

== Australia ==
- 4th Battalion (Australia)
- 4th Battalion, Royal Australian Regiment
- 4th Machine Gun Battalion
- 4th New Guinea Infantry Battalion
- 4th Pioneer Battalion (Australia)
- 2nd/4th Battalion, Royal Australian Regiment
- 2/4th Battalion (Australia)
- 2/4th Machine Gun Battalion
- 2/4th Pioneer Battalion

== Belgium ==
- 4th Commando Battalion (Belgium)
- 4th Engineer Battalion (Belgium)
- 4th Logistics Battalion

== Canada ==
- 4th Battalion, Canadian Mounted Rifles
- 4th Battalion (Central Ontario), CEF
- 4th Reconnaissance Battalion (4th Princess Louise Dragoon Guards)

== (British) India ==
- 4th Battalion Coast Sepoys
- 4th Battalion Bombay Sepoys
- 4th Madras Battalion

== Italy ==
- 4th Carabinieri Battalion "Veneto"
- 4th Engineer Battalion "Orta"
- 4th Maneuver Logistic Battalion
- 4th Signal Battalion "Gardena"
- 4th Tank Battalion "M.O. Passalacqua"
- IV Cyclists Battalion

== Ukraine ==
- 4th Battalion International Legion
- 4th Kruk Battalion
- 4th Nuclear Power Plant Protection Battalion

== United Kingdom ==
- 4th Battalion, Devonshire Regiment
- 4th Battalion, Duke of Lancaster's Regiment
- 4th Battalion, East Riding Local Militia
- 4th Battalion, East Yorkshire Regiment
- 4th Battalion, King's Own Royal Border Regiment
- 4th Battalion, Leicestershire Regiment
- 4th Battalion, Loyal North Lancashire Regiment
- 4th Battalion, Mercian Regiment
- 4th Battalion, Monmouthshire Regiment
- 4th Battalion, Northamptonshire Regiment
- 4th Battalion, Parachute Regiment
- 4th Battalion, The Princess of Wales's Royal Regiment
- 4th Battalion, Queen's Royal Regiment (West Surrey)
- 4th Battalion, The Ranger Regiment
- 4th Battalion, The Rifles
- 4th Battalion, Royal Regiment of Scotland
- 4th Battalion, Royal Sussex Regiment
- 4th Battalion, Royal Yorkshire Regiment
- 4th Battalion, Ulster Defence Regiment
- 4th Battalion, Yorkshire Volunteers
- 4th Battalion (1st Devon Militia), Devonshire Regiment
- 4th Battalion (Royal North Gloucestershire Militia), Gloucestershire Regiment
- 4th (1st King's Own Staffordshire Militia) Battalion, South Staffordshire Regiment
- 4th (1st Royal Lancashire Militia) Battalion, King's Own Royal Regiment (Lancaster)
- 4th (2nd Norfolk Militia) Battalion, Norfolk Regiment
- 4th (2nd Somerset Militia) Battalion, Somerset Light Infantry
- 4th (2nd Warwickshire Militia) Battalion, Royal Warwickshire Regiment
- 4th (3rd Royal Lancashire Militia) Battalion, Loyal North Lancashire Regiment
- 4th (3rd Royal Surrey Militia) Battalion, East Surrey Regiment
- 4th (Cambridge Militia) Battalion, Suffolk Regiment
- 4th (City of Bristol) Battalion of the Gloucestershire Rifles
- 4th (City of London) Battalion, London Regiment
- 4th (Denbighshire) Battalion, Royal Welsh Fusiliers
- 4th (East Kent Militia) Battalion, Buffs (East Kent Regiment)
- 4th (Extra Reserve) Battalion, King's (Liverpool Regiment)
- 4th (Extra Reserve) Battalion, Lancashire Fusiliers
- 4th (Extra Reserve) Battalion, Manchester Regiment
- 4th (Extra Reserve) Battalion, North Staffordshire Regiment
- 4th (Extra Reserve) Battalion, Prince of Wales's Leinster Regiment (Royal Canadians)
- 4th (Extra Reserve) Battalion, Royal Inniskilling Fusiliers
- 4th (Extra Reserve) Battalion, Royal Munster Fusiliers
- 4th (Hallamshire) Battalion, York and Lancaster Regiment
- 4th (Hereford Militia) Battalion, King's Shropshire Light Infantry
- 4th (Hertfordshire Militia) Battalion, Bedfordshire Regiment
- 4th (Kerry Militia) Battalion, Royal Munster Fusiliers
- 4th (Leicestershire Militia) Battalion, Leicestershire Regiment
- 4th (Londonderry Militia) Battalion, Royal Inniskilling Fusiliers
- 4th (Militia) Battalion, Cheshire Regiment
- 4th (Northampton and Rutland Militia) Battalion, Northamptonshire Regiment
- 4th (North York Militia) Battalion, Green Howards
- 4th (Oxford Militia) Battalion, Oxfordshire Light Infantry
- 4th (Queen's County Militia) Battalion, Prince of Wales's Leinster Regiment (Royal Canadians)
- 4th (Queen's Edinburgh Rifles) Battalion, Royal Scots
- 4th (Royal Carnarvon Militia) Battalion, Royal Welsh Fusiliers
- 4th (Royal East Middlesex Militia) Battalion, Middlesex Regiment
- 4th (Royal London Militia) Battalion, Royal Fusiliers
- 4th (Royal Montgomeryshire Militia) Battalion, South Wales Borderers
- 4th (Royal Sherwood Foresters Militia) Battalion, Sherwood Foresters
- 4th (Royal Sussex Militia) Battalion, Royal Sussex Regiment
- 4th (Royal Tyrone Militia) Battalion, Royal Inniskilling Fusiliers
- 4th (West Kent Militia) Battalion, Queen's Own (Royal West Kent Regiment)
- 4th (Worcestershire Militia) Battalion, Worcestershire Regiment
- 4th Administrative Battalion, Devonshire Rifle Volunteer Corps
- 4th Administrative Battalion, Durham Rifle Volunteer Corps
- 4th Administrative Battalion, Surrey Rifle Volunteer Corps
- 4th Administrative Battalion, Yorkshire West Riding Rifle Volunteer Corps
- 4th Volunteer Battalion, Bedfordshire Regiment
- 4th Volunteer Battalion, Cameronians (Scottish Rifles)
- 4th Volunteer Battalion, Cheshire Regiment
- 4th Volunteer Battalion, East Surrey Regiment
- 4th Volunteer Battalion, Essex Regiment
- 4th Volunteer Battalion, Manchester Regiment
- 4th Volunteer Battalion, Middlesex Regiment
- 4th Volunteer Battalion, Queen's (Royal West Surrey Regiment)
- 4th Volunteer Battalion, Royal Scots
- 4th (Volunteer) Battalion, Worcestershire and Sherwood Foresters
- 4th/3rd Battalion, Royal New South Wales Regiment
- 4th/6th Battalion, Ulster Defence Regiment
- No. 4 Commando, a battalion-sized unit

== United States ==
=== Confederate States Army ===
- 4th Arkansas Infantry Battalion
- 4th Louisiana Infantry Battalion
- 4th Mississippi Cavalry Battalion

=== Union Army ===
- 4th Battalion Massachusetts Volunteer Militia

=== United States Army ===
- 4th Battalion, 64th Armor Regiment
- 4th Battalion, 227th Aviation Regiment
- 4th Battalion, 9th Field Artillery Regiment
- 4th Battalion, 27th Field Artillery Regiment
- 4th Battalion, 41st Field Artillery Regiment
- 4th Battalion, 42nd Field Artillery Regiment
- 4th Battalion, 319th Field Artillery Regiment
- 4th Battalion, 320th Field Artillery Regiment
- 4th Battalion, 17th Infantry Regiment
- 4th Army Aviation Helicopter Battalion
- 4th Aviation Battalion
- 4th Engineer Battalion (United States)
- 4th Ranger Battalion

=== United States Marine Corps ===
- 4th Battalion, 10th Marines
- 4th Battalion, 14th Marines
- 4th Antiaircraft Artillery Battalion
- 4th Assault Amphibian Battalion
- 4th Combat Engineer Battalion
- 4th Dental Battalion
- 4th Landing Support Battalion
- 4th Law Enforcement Battalion
- 4th Light Armored Reconnaissance Battalion
- 4th Low Altitude Air Defense Battalion
- 4th Maintenance Battalion
- 4th Medical Battalion (United States Marine Corps)
- 4th Reconnaissance Battalion
- 4th Recruit Training Battalion
- 4th Supply Battalion
- 4th Tank Battalion (United States)

== Other countries ==
- 4th Single Infantry Battalion, Estonia
- 4th Lithuanian Construction Battalion, Nazi Germany
- 4th "Ali Demi" Battalion, Greece
- 4th Infantry Battalion (Ireland)
- 4th Battalion of the Military Units of the Uprising Emergency of Socialists, Polish Socialist Party – Freedom, Equality, Independence; part of the Polish resistance movement in World War II
- 4th Engineer Battalion (Romania)
- 4th Marine Battalion (South Vietnam)
- 4th Tank Battalion (Thailand)

== See also ==
- 4th Army (disambiguation)
- IV Corps (disambiguation)
- 4th Division (disambiguation)
- 4th Brigade (disambiguation)
- 4th Regiment (disambiguation)
- 4th Wing (disambiguation)
- 4th Squadron (disambiguation)
- 4th (disambiguation)
