= 4th Division =

In military terms, 4th Division may refer to:

== Infantry divisions ==
- 4th (Quetta) Division, British Indian Army
- 4th Alpine Division "Cuneense", Italy
- 4th Alpine Division "Monterosa", Italy
- 4th CC.NN. Division "3 Gennaio", Italy
- 4th Canadian Division
- 4th Division (Australia)
- 4th Division (Estonia)
- 4th Division (German Empire)
- 4th Division (Imperial Japanese Army)
- 4th Division (Iraq)
- 4th Division (Japan)
- 4th Division (New Zealand)
- 4th Division (North Korea)
- 4th Division (Norway)
- 4th Division (Reichswehr)
- 4th Division (Yugoslav Partisans)
- 4th Garrison Division of Fuzhou Military Region
- 4th Guards Infantry Division, German Empire
- 4th Guards Motor Rifle Division, Soviet Union
- 4th Guards Rifle Division, Soviet Union
- 4th Infantry Division (Belgium)
- 4th Infantry Division (Greece)
- 4th Infantry Division (India)
- 4th Infantry Division (Philippines)
- 4th Infantry Division (Poland)
- 4th Infantry Division (Romania)
- 4th Infantry Division (Russian Empire)
- 4th Infantry Division (Thailand)
- 4th Infantry Division (United Kingdom)
- 4th Infantry Division (United States)
- 4th Infantry Division (Wehrmacht)
- 4th Infantry Division "Littorio", Italy
- 4th Infantry Division "Livorno", Italy
- 4th Landwehr Division, German Empire
- 4th Luftwaffe Field Division, Germany
- 4th Marine Division, United States
- 4th Moroccan Mountain Division
- 4th Motorized Infantry Division, People's Republic of China
- 4th Mountain Division (Wehrmacht)
- 4th NKVD Rifle Division, Soviet Union
- 4th North African Infantry Division
- 4th Panzergrenadier Division (Bundeswehr)
- 4th Reserve Division, People's Republic of China
- 4th Rifle Division (Poland)
- 4th Rifle Division (Soviet Union)
- 4th Royal Bavarian Division
- 4th Siberian Rifle Division
- 4th SS Polizei Panzergrenadier Division, Germany
- Finnish 4th Division (Winter War)

== Cavalry divisions ==
- 4th Light Cavalry Division, France
- 4th Cavalry Division (German Empire)
- 1st Indian Cavalry Division, designated 4th Cavalry Division from November 1916 to March 1918 in France in World War I
- 4th Cavalry Division (India), British Indian Army
- 4th Cavalry Division (Russian Empire)
- 4th Mounted Division, United Kingdom

== Armoured divisions ==
- 4th Canadian Division
- 4th Armoured Division (Egypt)
- 4th Armoured Division (France, 1964)
- 4th Armored Division (France, 1940)
- 4th Light Division, Wehrmacht
- 4th Panzer Division (Wehrmacht)
- 4th Tank Division (Imperial Japanese Army)
- 4th Guards Tank Division, Russia
- 4th Armoured Division (Syria)
- 4th Infantry Division (United Kingdom) - an armoured division in the 1980s
- 4th Armored Division (United States)

== Aviation divisions ==
- 4th Aviation Division, People's Liberation Army Air Force, China
- 4th Air Division (Germany)
- 4th Fighter Division, Germany
- 4th Air Division, United States

== Naval divisions ==
- 3rd and 4th Divisions, British Royal Navy
- 4th Carrier Division, Imperial Japanese Navy
- ALRI 4th Division, Indonesian Navy
- Carrier Division 4, United States Navy

== Other divisions ==
- 4th Flak Division, Germany
- 4th Parachute Division, Germany
- 4th Guards Airborne Division, Soviet Union
- 4th Antiaircraft Missile Division, People's Republic of China
- 4th Anti-Aircraft Artillery Division, Soviet Union
- 4th Guards Anti-Aircraft Artillery Division, Soviet Union
- 4th Rocket Division, Soviet Union
- 4th Army Division, Sweden
- 4th Airborne Division (United Kingdom), deception formation
- 4th Anti-Aircraft Division (United Kingdom)

== See also ==
- Fourth Division (disambiguation), sports divisions
- Fourth Army (disambiguation)
- IV Corps (disambiguation)
- 4th Brigade (disambiguation)
- 4th Regiment (disambiguation)
- 4 Squadron (disambiguation)
