= 4th Brigade Combat Team =

4th Brigade Combat Team or 4 BCT is a modularized brigade of the United States Army. Each division of the United States Army fields 4th Brigade Combat Teams numbered from 1-4.

- 4th Brigade Combat Team, 1st Armored Division
- 4th Brigade Combat Team, 1st Cavalry Division
- 4th Infantry Brigade Combat Team, 1st Infantry Division
- 4th Brigade Combat Team, 2nd Infantry Division
- 4th Brigade Combat Team, 3rd Infantry Division
- 4th Brigade Combat Team, 4th Infantry Division
- 4th Brigade Combat Team, 10th Mountain Division
- 4th Brigade Combat Team, 82nd Airborne Division
- 4th Brigade Combat Team, 101st Airborne Division

== See also ==
- 4th Division (disambiguation)
- 4th Brigade (disambiguation)
- 4th Regiment (disambiguation)
- 4th Squadron (disambiguation)
