= IV Corps =

4 Corps, 4th Corps, Fourth Corps, or IV Corps may refer to:

== Finland ==
- IV Corps (Finland, Winter War)
- IV Corps (Finland, Continuation War)

== France ==
- 4th Army Corps (France)
- IV Cavalry Corps (Grande Armée), a cavalry unit of the Imperial French Army during the Napoleonic Wars
- IV Corps (Grande Armée), a unit of the Imperial French Army during the Napoleonic Wars

== Germany ==
=== German Empire ===
- IV Cavalry Corps (German Empire), Imperial German Army
- IV Corps (German Empire), Imperial German Army
- IV Reserve Corps, Imperial German Army

=== Nazi Germany ===
- 4th Air Corps, Luftwaffe, Wehrmacht
- IV Army Corps (Wehrmacht), later the IV Panzer Corps
- IV Flak Corps, Luftwaffe, Wehrmacht
- IV SS Panzer Corps, Waffen-SS

== Soviet Union and Russia ==
=== Russian Empire ===
- 4th Army Corps (Russian Empire)
- 4th Caucasus Army Corps
- 4th Cavalry Corps (Russian Empire)
- 4th Siberian Army Corps

=== Russian Civil War ===
- 4th Eastern Siberian Corps, Russian Civil War, White Movement

=== Soviet Union ===
- 4th Airborne Corps
- 4th Artillery Corps
- 4th Cavalry Corps (Soviet Union)
- 4th Fighter Aviation Corps
- 4th Guards Army Corps
- 4th Guards Cavalry Corps
- 4th Guards Mechanized Corps
- 4th Guards Tank Corps
- 4th Mechanized Corps
- 4th Rifle Corps

== United Kingdom ==
- IV Corps (United Kingdom)

=== Artillery Volunteer Corps ===
- 4th (Town of Aberdeen) Aberdeenshire Artillery Volunteer Corps
- 4th (West Tarbert) Argyllshire Artillery Volunteer Corps
- 4th (Ardrossan) Ayrshire Artillery Volunteer Corps
- 4th (Portsoy) Banffshire Artillery Volunteer Corps
- 4th (Mey) Caithness Artillery Volunteer Corps
- 4th (New Brighton) Cheshire Artillery Volunteer Corps
- 4th (Charlestown) Cornwall Artillery Volunteer Corps
- 4th (Workington) Cumberland Artillery Volunteer Corps
- 4th (Torquay) Devonshire Artillery Volunteer Corps
- 4th (Portland) Dorsetshire Artillery Volunteer Corps
- 4th (Hartlepool) Durham Artillery Volunteer Corps
- 4th (Inverkeithing) Fife Artillery Volunteer Corps
- 4th (Broughty Ferry) Forfarshire Artillery Volunteer Corps
- 4th (Cardiff) Glamorganshire Artillery Volunteer Corps
- 4th (Forest of Dean) Gloucestershire Artillery Volunteer Corps
- 4th (Bournemouth) Hampshire Artillery Volunteer Corps
- 4th (Bervie) Kincardineshire Artillery Volunteer Corps
- 4th (1st Northern) Lanarkshire Artillery Volunteer Corps
- 4th (The Authors' Volunteer Horse Artillery) Middlesex Artillery Volunteer Corps
- 4th (Musselburgh) Midlothian Artillery Volunteer Corps
- 4th (Stromness) Orkney Artillery Volunteer Corps
- 4th (Beccles) Suffolk Artillery Volunteer Corps
- 4th (Hull) Yorkshire (East Riding) Artillery Volunteer Corps
- 4th (Sheffield) Yorkshire (West Riding) Artillery Volunteer Corps

=== Rifle Volunteer Corps ===
- 4th (Hay) Brecknockshire Rifle Volunteer Corps
- 4th (Tremadoc) Carnarvonshire Rifle Volunteer Corps
- 4th (Vale of Gresford) Denbighshire Rifle Volunteer Corps
- 4th Essex Rifle Volunteer Corps
- 4th (Holywell) Flintshire Rifle Volunteer Corps
- 4th (Stroud) Gloucestershire Rifle Volunteer Corps
- 4th (Crosby) Isle of Man Rifle Volunteer Corps
- 4th (Nunwell) Isle of Wight Rifle Volunteer Corps
- 4th (Glasgow, 1st Northern) Lanarkshire Rifle Volunteer Corps
- 4th Lancashire Rifle Volunteer Corps
- 4th (2nd Leicester Town Rifles) Leicestershire Rifle Volunteer Corps
- 4th (Bathgate) Linlithgowshire Rifle Volunteer Corps
- 4th (Kensington Rifles) Middlesex Rifle Volunteer Corps
- 4th Kent (Royal Arsenal) Rifle Volunteer Corps
- 4th Kent (Woolwich Town) Rifle Volunteer Corps
- 4th (West London) Middlesex Rifle Volunteer Corps
- 4th (Machynlleth) Montgomeryshire Rifle Volunteer Corps
- 4th (Northampton) Northamptonshire Rifle Volunteer Corps
- 4th (Lewes) Sussex Rifle Volunteer Corps
- 4th (Hull) Yorkshire (East Riding) Rifle Volunteer Corps

== United States ==
- IV Corps (United States)
- IV Corps (Union Army)
- Fourth Corps, Army of Northern Virginia
- Fourth Army Corps (Spanish–American War)

== Other countries ==
- 4th Corps (Afghanistan)
- 4th Army Corps (Armenia)
- 4th Army Corps (Azerbaijan)
- 4th Corps (Army of the Republic of Bosnia and Herzegovina)
- 4th Bombay Infantry (or Rifle Corps), British India
- IV Army Corps (Greece)
- IV Corps (Hungary)
- IV Corps (India)
- IV Army Corps (Italy)
- IV Corps (North Korea)
- IV Corps (Ottoman Empire)
- IV Corps (Pakistan)
- 4th Territorial Army Corps, Romania
- IV Corps (South Vietnam)
- IV Army Corps (Spain)
- 4th Corps (Syria)
- 4th Corps (Turkey)
- 4th Corps (Vietnam)
- 4th Corps (Yugoslav Partisans)

== Other uses ==
- Blocker Corps IV, a Japanese anime series

== See also ==
- List of military corps by number
- 4th Army (disambiguation)
- 4th Brigade (disambiguation)
- 4th Division (disambiguation)
- 4th Regiment (disambiguation)
- 4th Squadron (disambiguation)
