= 4th Mounted Brigade =

4th Mounted Brigade may refer to:

- 4th (London) Mounted Brigade, designation given to the London Mounted Brigade while serving with the 2nd Mounted Division in the Gallipoli Campaign
- 4th Mounted Brigade (United Kingdom), also known as 2/1st South Wales Mounted Brigade

== See also ==
- 4th Brigade (disambiguation)
- 4th Cavalry (disambiguation)
