= 4th Rifle Division =

4th Rifle Division can refer to:

- 4th Guards Rifle Division
- 4th Guards Motor Rifle Division
- 4th Rifle Division (Poland)
- 4th Rifle Division (Soviet Union)
- 4th Siberian Rifle Division
- 4th NKVD Rifle Division

== See also ==
- 4th Division (disambiguation)
