= 4th Mechanised Brigade =

In military terms, 4th Mechanised Brigade or similar may refer to:

- 4 Canadian Mechanized Brigade Group
- 4th Mechanized Brigade (Kazakhstan)
- Skaraborg Brigade, Sweden
- 4th Mechanised Infantry Brigade (Turkey)
- 4th Heavy Mechanized Brigade, Ukraine
- 4th Mechanized Brigade (United Kingdom)

== See also ==
- 4th Brigade (disambiguation)
