= Fourth Army =

Fourth Army or 4th Army may refer to:

== Germany ==
- 4th Army (German Empire), a World War I field Army
- 4th Army (Wehrmacht), a World War II field army
- 4th Panzer Army

== Russia - Soviet Union ==
- 4th Army (Russian Empire)
- 4th Army (RSFSR)
- 4th Army (Soviet Union)
- 4th Air Army, Soviet Union and Russia, later the 4th Guards Air and Air Defence Forces Army
- 4th Guards Army, Soviet Union
- 4th Guards Tank Army
- 4th Tank Army, Soviet Union, briefly the 4th Guards Tank Army
- 4th Independent Air Defence Army

== Others ==
- 4th Army (Austria-Hungary)
- Fourth Army (Bulgaria)
- 4th Army (Czechoslovakia)
- Fourth Army (National Revolutionary Army), Republic of China
- Fourth Field Army, People's Liberation Army
- New Fourth Army, Republic of China
- 4th Army (France)
- 4th Army (Italy)
- Fourth Air Army (Japan)
- Fourth Army (Japan)
- Fourth Army (Ottoman Empire)
- Fourth Army (Romania)
- Fourth Army (United Kingdom)
- Fourth United States Army
- 4th Army (Kingdom of Yugoslavia)
- 4th Army (Yugoslav Partisans)

== See also ==
- List of armies by number
- IV Corps (disambiguation)
- 4th Division (disambiguation)
- 4th Brigade (disambiguation)
- 4th Regiment (disambiguation)
- 4th Wing (disambiguation)
- 4th Squadron (disambiguation)
- 4th (disambiguation)
