= 4th Airborne Brigade =

4th Airborne Brigade or 4th Parachute Brigade may refer to:

- IV Airborne Brigade (Argentina)
- 4th Brigade Combat Team, 82nd Airborne Division
- 4th Brigade Combat Team, 101st Airborne Division
- 4th Parachute Brigade (United Kingdom)

== See also ==
- 4th Brigade (disambiguation)
