= William Cooper (priest) =

Anglo-Irish priest (1835–1909)

Canon William Henry Cooper (c. 1835 - 13 April 1909) was an Anglo-Irish priest of the Church of England who served as a missionary in Australia and New Zealand and Canada. He founded St Luke's Hospital for the Clergy in London and the College of St. Barnabas in Lingfield, Surrey.

== Early years ==
As A.Tindal Hart writes in his memoir, "William Henry Cooper's origins are obscure. An Irish-man from the county of Tipperary in Southern Ireland, he undoubtedly sprang from an Anglo-Irish family with strong Church and Military tradition".

Cooper was born in Dublin, Ireland, the son of gentleman William Cooper and Catherine Elizabeth LeClerc, daughter of Pierre Abercrombie LeClerc. Upon leaving school, he and his younger brother, Charles Abercrombie Cooper, went straight into the Army. William was commissioned as Ensign in the 2nd Royal Cheshire Militia on 5 May 1855, shortly after his marriage by licence to Anna Matilda Wilson. By the time he had become a Lieutenant his thoughts were turning away from the prospect of a military career towards becoming ordained into the Church of Ireland.

On 23 December 1860 he was ordained deacon by Bishop Robert Daly of Cashel in Waterford.

== Missionary work ==
Soon after being ordained a priest he wrote: "I determined to offer myself for missionary work." The Society for the Propagation of the Gospel accepted the new missionary; after an interview with Bishop Perry of Melbourne, he and Anna sailed to Australia in April 1864. He built two churches and a parsonage, and laid the foundations of another church. Hussey Macartney, Dean and Archdeacon of Melbourne, wrote:

"I have known the Revd W. H. Cooper for about five years. On his arrival in this colony, in the absence of the Lord Bishop, he undertook, at my request, what everyone regarded as the most arduous and difficult post in the diocese ... He is active, zealous, laborious and enterprising, and is capable of gaining great influence over those with whom he comes into contact."

In June 1870, Cooper began another ministry in the Anglican Diocese of Christchurch, New Zealand. The dangers involved in this new work were noted in his reports, in one of which he commented:

"The many dangerous rivers were not bridged, and travelling on horseback, which was the only way of getting about the country, was attended by many dangers. I was three times swept off my horse fording the rivers, twice providentially preserved from being drowned."

After seven years he could no longer ride a horse, and his doctor advised him a change of climate, so in 1877 he returned to Australia. After a short time he returned to Ireland where he became an SPG deputation preacher and lecturer.

By 1883, his health had recovered and he volunteered for a special SPG mission to Canada. His work included caring for thousands of British emigrants as well as founding the Church Emigration Society.

Anna Cooper became ill and the couple returned to England in 1889; Anna died in 1891. Soon after this he married Evelyn Mary Faithfull (daughter of Revered George Faithfull of Horsmonden, Kent).

== St Luke's Hostel and the Homes of St Barnabas ==
In 1892, the newly married couple began the two projects that were to occupy the next eight years of their lives; the founding of St Luke's Hospital and the Homes of St Barnabas. Cooper became secretary of St Luke’s Council and by 1894 the St Luke's Hostel and Nursing Home was established.

The idea of forming a community of retired Anglican clergy came to Cooper in 1890. While visiting on the south coast, he and a friend discovered dozens of retired priests, without any income, living in workhouses. He determined to do something, and set about the task of founding a new community, of which he was to become the first Warden.

St Luke's Council however, felt they should concentrate on establishing the hostel before attempting to extend the scheme. Cooper resigned as secretary in 1895, secured an agreement to rent a house in Dormans Park, Surrey, and admitted the first resident in 1895. As the number of residents increased another house was rented and "The Homes of St Barnabas" were born.

Cooper went on to raise funds for a permanent home for the community and purchased a nine-acre portion of land in Lingfield, Surrey. The site was partly chosen due to its mild climate and beautiful surroundings and partly because it is adjacent to Dormans railway station and so within easy reach of London. The foundation stone was laid in July 1900 and the West wing and administrative block were opened the following year. Over time the buildings continued to be developed with the addition of the East wing and an extension to the chapel.

After establishing the Homes of St Barnabas, Cooper and Evelyn sailed to Australia where he served for four years. They then returned to England and he was appointed chaplain to the Lansdowne Hospital in Bath, where he remained for two years, before retiring to Worthing.

In the spring of 1909, he fell seriously ill and was taken to St Luke's hostel, where he died on 13 April, aged 75 years. His remains were cremated at Golders Green.

A. Tindal Hart writes in his memoir:

unlike other social reformers of this period, such as Dr Barnardo, his pioneering work in that field has gone largely unnoticed. There was little mention of it in the public media of the day, and no worthy obituary notices were forthcoming. Certainly there has never been a biography. It is to be hoped that this Memoir may at least do something to remedy the omission.

== Legacy ==
By 1977, St Barnabas' home had become a place of study and the name was changed to become The College of St Barnabas. The college has hosted a number of residents and visitors, including the Reverend Dr. John Stott, a leader of the worldwide evangelical movement.

In September 2021, the College of St. Barnabas began operating exclusively as a residential care home. Revd David Williams was the Chair of Trustees at that time.

St Luke’s Hostel became St Luke's Nursing Home for the Clergy. The hospital ran until 2009 when financial costs forced its closure. The charity continues as St Luke's for Clergy Well-Being.

Mrs Cooper continued to live in Worthing for some years after her husband's death. She died on December 3, 1936.

== Sources ==
- A Memoir by A. Tindal Hart, Printed by the Further Education Unit, Lingfield
- Crockford's Clerical Directory
- Early annual reports of St Luke's Hospital, London
- Early annual reports of the College of St Barnabas, Lingfield, Surrey
- Testimonials from Archbishop Benson's papers at Lambeth Palace
- SPG Minutes
- Kelly's Directory of Sussex
- Burke's Landed Gentry
- Canon William Cooper's few letters
- Articles in Mission Field and The Church Times
- Notices of his death in The Times and The Manchester Guardian
