= 4th Frigate Squadron =

4th Frigate Squadron may refer to the following units:

- 4th Frigate Squadron (Germany)
- 4th Frigate Squadron (United Kingdom)

== See also ==
- Frigate
- 4th Squadron (disambiguation)
