= 4th Engineer Battalion =

4th Engineer Battalion may refer to:

- 4th Engineer Battalion (Belgium)
- 4th Engineer Battalion "Orta", Italy
- 4th Engineer Battalion (Romania)
- 4th Engineer Battalion (United States), United States Army
- 4th Combat Engineer Battalion, United States Marine Corps

== See also ==
- 4th Battalion (disambiguation)
