= Fourth Division =

In sport, the Fourth Division, also called Division 4 or Division IV, is often the fourth-highest division of a league, and will often have promotion and relegation with divisions above and below.

== Association football ==
- Belgian Fourth Division, lowest nationwide division in the league system of Belgian football
  - Belgian Fourth Division A
  - Belgian Fourth Division B
  - Belgian Fourth Division C
  - Belgian Fourth Division D
- Cypriot Fourth Division, fourth tier football competition in Cyprus
- Czech Fourth Division, fourth tier football competition in the Czech Republic
- Egyptian Third Division, fourth division in the league system of Egyptian football
- Football League Fourth Division, fourth-highest level in the league system of English football
- French Division 4 (disambiguation)
- Greek Fourth Division, fourth level in the league system of Greek football
- Hong Kong Fourth Division League, fifth level in the league system of Hong Kong football
- Lebanese Fourth Division, fourth division in the league system of Lebanese football
- 4. divisjon, fifth tier in the league system of Norwegian football
- Swedish Football Division 4, sixth level in the league system of Swedish football
- Swedish Women's Football Division 4, sixth level in the league system of Swedish women's football

== Other sports ==
- ICC World Cricket League Division Four
- IIHF World Championship Division IV, lowest level of the Ice Hockey World Championships

== See also ==
- 4th Division (disambiguation), for usage of the term in the military
- (various places in Canada)
- D4 (disambiguation)
- Division 4, Australian television police drama series
