= 4th Tank Battalion =

4th Tank Battalion may refer to:

- 4th Tank Battalion "M.O. Passalacqua", Italy
- 4th Tank Battalion (Thailand)
- 4th Tank Battalion (United States)

== See also ==
- 4th Battalion (disambiguation)
