= St Luke's for Clergy Wellbeing =

British charity for clergy wellbeing support

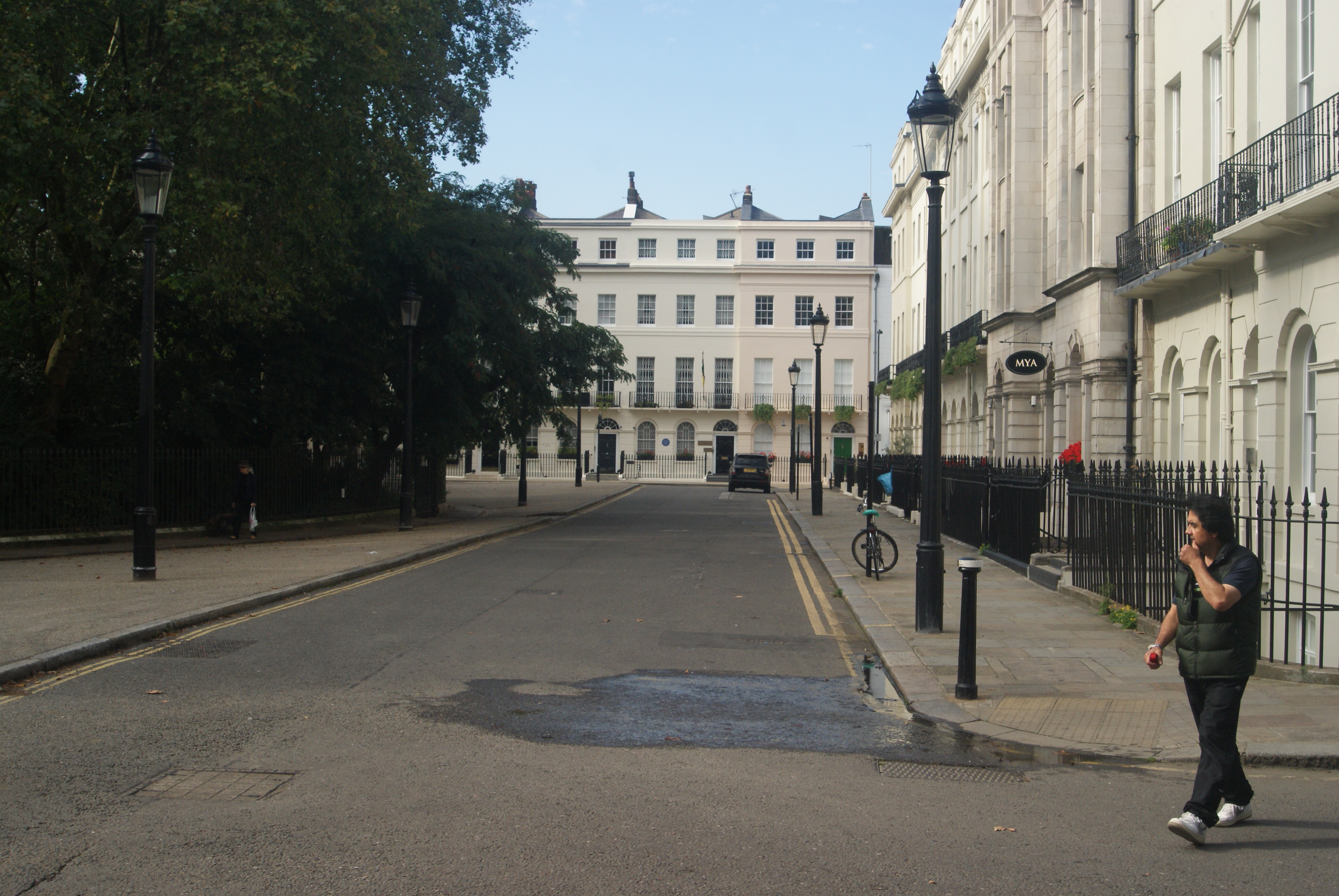
- St Luke's Hospital (on the right with the black hanging sign "MYA")
- Formation: 1892; 134 years ago
- Founder: William Henry Cooper
- Founded at: Beaumont Street, London
- Type: Charity
- Purpose: Support for the mental health and wellbeing of Anglican clergy
- Headquarters: Church House, Westminster
- Services: Clergy wellbeing support
- Website: stlukesforclergy.org.uk
- Formerly called: St Luke's Hospital for the Clergy; St Luke's Healthcare for the Clergy

St Luke's for Clergy Wellbeing, previously known as St Luke's Hospital for the Clergy, is a charity founded in 1892 to support sick members of Anglican clergy and which originally owned a hospital in Fitzroy Square, London. In 2009 the building was sold (it is now a private hospital); the charity was renamed St Luke's Healthcare for the Clergy the following year. In 2022 it was renamed as St Luke's for Clergy Wellbeing and the focus is now on mental health and wellbeing.

== History ==
The hospital project was founded in 1892 by Canon William Henry Cooper and his second wife, and opened initially as a hostel in Beaumont Street, accommodating seven patients before moving to larger premises at 16 Nottingham Place in 1894. In 1904 two houses were acquired in Fitzroy Square. Each was rebuilt, the first being opened by Queen Alexandra in 1907, and the second opened by Queen Mary in 1923. The Queen Mother visited the hospital in 1957.

In 1994, the hospital was refurbished and redeveloped in a scheme designed by architect Ronald Wylde Associates. On 17 January 1995, it was rededicated by the Archbishop of Canterbury, and officially reopened by Queen Elizabeth II, accompanied by the Duke of Edinburgh, on 8 March 1995.

Another refurbishment was undertaken in 2005 (funded by charitable donations from the Laing Family Trusts), but in 2008 it was announced that, due to rising costs, the Fitzroy Square building was to be sold. The hospital was transferred, together with the majority of the staff, to BMI Healthcare in April 2009 and the freehold of the property was sold to an institutional investor in June 2009.

St Luke's Hospital for the Clergy re-branded itself as St Luke's for Clergy Wellbeing in June 2022 and now supports the mental health of the Anglican clergy from Church House in Westminster. Meanwhile, the facility in Fitzroy Square was transferred to MYA, specialists in cosmetic surgery, and became known as MYA St Luke's Hospital in 2014.
