= 71st Motor Rifle Division =

Motor rifle division of the Soviet military

- Active: 1984–1989
- Country: Soviet Union
- Branch: Soviet Army
- Garrison/HQ: Semipalatinsk

The 71st Motor Rifle Division (Military Unit Number 07225) was a motorized infantry division of the Soviet Army between 1984 and 1989. It was based in Semipalatinsk. Converted to a storage base in 1989, it was taken over by Kazakhstan with the dissolution of the Soviet Union.

== History ==
The 71st Motor Rifle Division was activated in 1984 from elements of the 155th Motor Rifle Division as a mobilization division. The division was based in Semipalatinsk and was part of the 32nd Army. In March 1988, it became part of the 1st Army Corps after the redesignation of the 32nd Army. The mobilization division was redesignated as a territorial training center and later became the 5202nd Weapons and Equipment Storage Base on 1 November 1989. In 1991, the 40th Army was reformed and the storage base became part of it. The storage base was taken over by Kazakhstan in March 1992. The equipment of the base was used to form the Kazakh Military Unit 30217 at Semey, whose first post-independence commander was Major General Aleksandr Martynov. Open source data identifies the unit as the 8th Separate Mechanized Brigade. The unit is part of Regional Command East.
