= 4th Cavalry =

4th Cavalry, 4th Cavalry Division, 4th Cavalry Brigade or 4th Cavalry Regiment may refer to:

== Corps ==
- IV Cavalry Corps (Grande Armée)
- IV Cavalry Corps (German Empire)
- 4th Cavalry Corps (Russian Empire)
- 4th Cavalry Corps (Soviet Union)
- 4th Guards Cavalry Corps, Soviet Union

== Divisions ==
- 4th Light Cavalry Division (France)
- 4th Cavalry Division (German Empire)
- 1st Indian Cavalry Division, which was designated the 4th Cavalry Division from November 1916 to March 1918 in France
- 4th Cavalry Division (India)
- 4th Cavalry Division (Russian Empire)
- 4th Cavalry Division (Soviet Union), see List of Soviet divisions 1917–1945 § Cavalry Divisions

== Brigades ==
- 4th Cavalry Brigade (Australia)
- 4th (Lucknow) Cavalry Brigade, of the Indian Army from September 1920 to 1923
- 4th (Meerut) Cavalry Brigade, of the Indian Army in the First World War
- 4th (Secunderabad) Cavalry Brigade, of the Indian Army in the Second World War
- 4th Cavalry Brigade (Imperial Japanese Army)
- 4th Cavalry Brigade (Poland)
- 4th Cavalry Brigade (United Kingdom)
- 4th Cavalry Brigade (United States)

== Regiments ==
- 4th Cavalry Regiment (Australia)
- 4th Cavalry (India), a regiment of the Indian Army
- 4th Cavalry (Pakistan), an armoured regiment of the Pakistan Army
- 4th Cavalry Regiment (United States)
- 4th United States Colored Cavalry Regiment, a Union regiment of the American Civil War
- 4th Arkansas Cavalry Regiment (Confederate), a Confederate regiment of the American Civil War
- 4th Arkansas Cavalry Regiment (Union), a Union regiment of the American Civil War
- 4th Iowa Cavalry Regiment, a Union regiment of the American Civil War
- 4th Kentucky Cavalry Regiment (Union), a Union regiment of the American Civil War
- 4th Michigan Cavalry Regiment, a Union regiment of the American Civil War
- 4th Mississippi Cavalry Regiment, a Confederate regiment of the American Civil War
- 4th Ohio Cavalry Regiment, a Union regiment of the American Civil War
- 4th Pennsylvania Cavalry Regiment, a Union regiment of the American Civil War
- 4th South Carolina Cavalry Regiment, a Confederate regiment of the American Civil War
- 4th Virginia Cavalry Regiment, a Confederate regiment of the American Civil War
