= 40th Army =

- 40-я общевойсковая армия
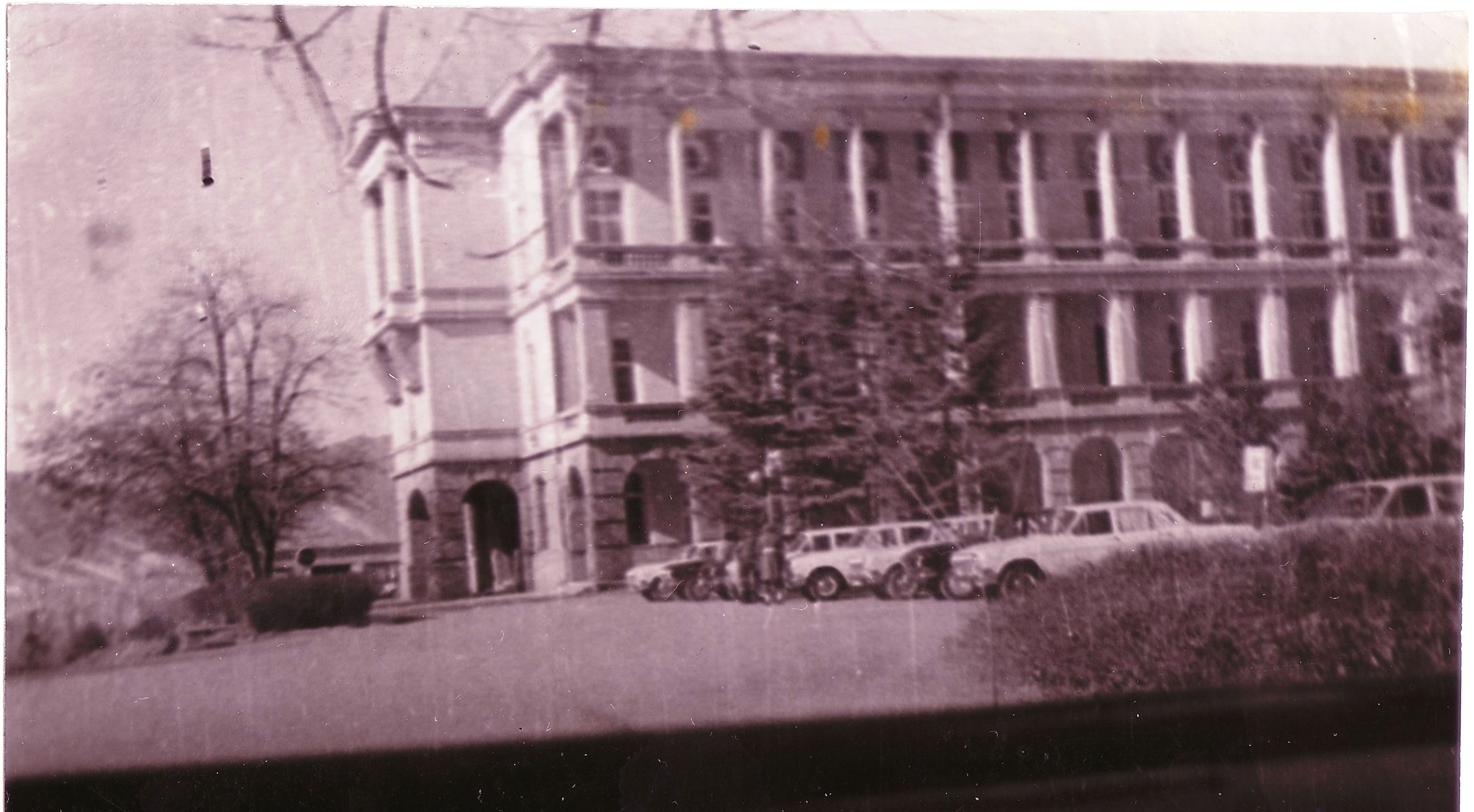
- Staff headquarters building of the 40th Army, Kabul, 1986
- Active: 1941–1945, 1979 – c. 1990
- Country: Soviet Union
- Branch: Soviet Ground Forces
- Type: Combined arms
- Size: Field army varied in size; usually several divisions
- Engagements: World War II; Second Battle of Kiev; Second Jassy–Kishinev offensive; Battle of the Dnieper; Battle of Kursk; Soviet–Afghan War

Commanders
- Notable commanders: Boris Gromov

The 40th Army (Russian: 40-я общевойсковая армия, 40-ya obshchevoyskovaya armiya, "40th Combined Arms Army") of the Soviet Ground Forces was an army-level command that participated in World War II from 1941 to 1945 and was reformed specifically for the Soviet–Afghan War from 1979 to circa 1990. The Army became the land forces arm of the Soviet contingent in Afghanistan in the 1980s, the Limited Contingent of Soviet Forces in Afghanistan.

== First formation (World War II) ==
It was first formed, after Operation Barbarossa, the German invasion of the Soviet Union, had commenced, from elements of the 26th and 37th Armies under the command of Major General Kuzma Petrovich Podlas in August 1941 at the boundary of the Bryansk Front and the Soviet Southwestern Front. By 25 August 1941 the 135th and 293rd Rifle Divisions, 2nd Airborne Corps, 10th Tank Division, and 5th Anti-Tank Brigade had been assembled to form the force. As part of the Southwestern Front, it then took part in the Battle of Kiev (1941), where the Army was badly shattered, and General-Major Semenchenko's 10th Tank Division was reduced to twenty tanks. By the time of the main German offensive against Moscow at the end of September, 40th Army was on the extreme right flank of Southwestern Front defending the Kursk axis. The German offensive was directed primarily at Soviet forces to the north of 40th Army, though the attack of the German 48th Motorised (Panzer) Corps, which was operating on the extreme southern flank of Second Panzer Group, also hit 40th Army's right flank positions. 40th Army began a slow and steady retreat to the east. By 3 November 40th Army had been driven from Kursk, but by the end of the month it had brought the German advance to a halt near the town of Tim some 50 kilometres further east.

As part of a general winter offensive by the Red Army across the entire Eastern Front, on 1 January 1942 40th Army, by then based on six rifle divisions and two tank brigades, attacked German positions east of Tim. Off 40th Army's right flank the 13th Army had for several weeks been conducting offensive operations towards Orel, advancing some 50 kilometres to the west and retaking Elets and Kastornoye in the process. The advance of 40th Army was less rapid. By 3 January 40th Army, in conjunction with 21st Army further south, was involved in heavy fighting on the line of the Seym river as the two armies attempted to advance on Kursk and Oboyan respectively. 40th Army retook Tim and advanced to within 30 kilometres of Kursk before being stopped by determined German resistance in mid-January. Thereafter the frontline stabilised west of Tim through the rest of the winter and through the spring. On 3 April 40th Army and its sector of the frontline was assigned to the command of Bryansk Front. On 12 May 1942 Southwestern Front launched a major offensive to retake Kharkov by an encirclement from north and south. At the same time Bryansk Front was preparing an offensive of its own to retake Orel. However, by 16 May the offensive by Southwestern Front north of Kharkov had stalled and Bryansk Front was ordered to divert the bulk of its combat aircraft to 40th Army in the south and to launch an immediate offensive by 40th Army to support Southwestern Front's right wing. However, this hurriedly prepared offensive by 40th Army in the second half of May made little progress.

In June 1942, Operation Blau saw Hoth's Fourth Panzer Army thrust in full force against 40th Army, which had its headquarters overrun by 24th Panzer Division on 29–30 June. The 40th Army fell back from the Kastornoye area back to Voronezh, alongside the 4th, 17th, and 24th Tank Corps. In response, Stavka hastened to establish the new Voronezh Front. During July, 40th Army, subordinated to Voronezh Front, was assigned to defend the river Don along the Liski - Pavlovsk sector, positions that it held throughout the remainder of 1942.

On 12 January 1943 40th Army began offensive operations against the left flank of the Hungarian Second Army north of Liski. This offensive was coordinated with an attack by a Soviet tank army further south to surround Axis forces on the Liski - Novaya Kalitva sector of the Don front. By 18 January most of the Hungarian army and an Italian corps had been surrounded east of Alekseyevka. The advance of 40th Army had left the German Second Army in exposed positions at Voronezh and, in a hurriedly prepared offensive coordinated with three other Soviet armies further north, 40th Army struck north on 24 January to surround much of Second Army east of Kastornoye. Having barely completed this operation, on 2 February 40th Army was launched into an offensive on the Kharkov axis to the southwest. It took Novy Oskol on 5 February and reached Belgorod four days later. Continuing to the southwest, 40th Army had reached Akhtyrka northwest of Kharkov by 23 February, but by then a German counter-offensive on the Kharkov axis had developed and 40th Army was pushed back to defensive positions east of Sumy. These defensive positions, which were to form part of the southern face of the Kursk Salient, remained largely unchanged through April, May and June 1943.

In March 1943 6th Pontoon Bridge Brigade joined the army.

On 5 July 1943 Germany's last strategic offensive on the Eastern Front (Operation Citadel) opened with attacks on the northern and southern shoulders of the Kursk Salient. The objective was to envelop and destroy the defending Central and Voronezh Fronts north and south of Kursk. At that time 40th Army, occupying what was expected to be a relatively quiet sector of the frontline facing the left flank of the German Fourth Panzer Army, was based on seven rifle divisions with armoured support. During the Battle of Kursk, where the Army fought as part of Voronezh Front, it transferred a number of reinforcements to 6th Guards Army to help 6th Guards hold back the 48th Panzer Corps, including the 29th Tank Destroyer Brigade and the 1244th and 869th Tank Destroyer Regiments, a total of over 100 antitank guns. 40th Army also transferred a tank brigade to 38th Army at the same time. After the battle, it was involved in the crossing of the Dnepr in September 1943 in conjunction with airborne operations. The Army was later involved in the Battle of Kiev (1943) and in 1944, as part of 2nd Ukrainian Front, actions around the Korsun-Cherkassy Pocket, Kamenets-Podolsky pocket, and the Uman-Botoshany, Iassy-Kishinev, Bratislava-Brno, and Prague Offensives. It also fought in the Battle of Debrecen, at which, due to its low priority, it only had five divisions assigned. 40th Army was disbanded in July 1945.

=== Commanders ===
- General-Major Kuzma Podlas 8.1941 – 2.1942
- Lieutenant General Mikhail Parsegov 2.1942 – 6.1942
- Lieutenant General Markian Popov 6.1942 – 10.1942
- Lieutenant General Kirill Moskalenko 10.1942 – 10.1943
- Lieutenant General Filipp Zhmachenko 10.1943 – 7.1945
- Colonel-General Vladimir Kolpakchi 1945 – 1946

== Second formation (OKSVA) ==
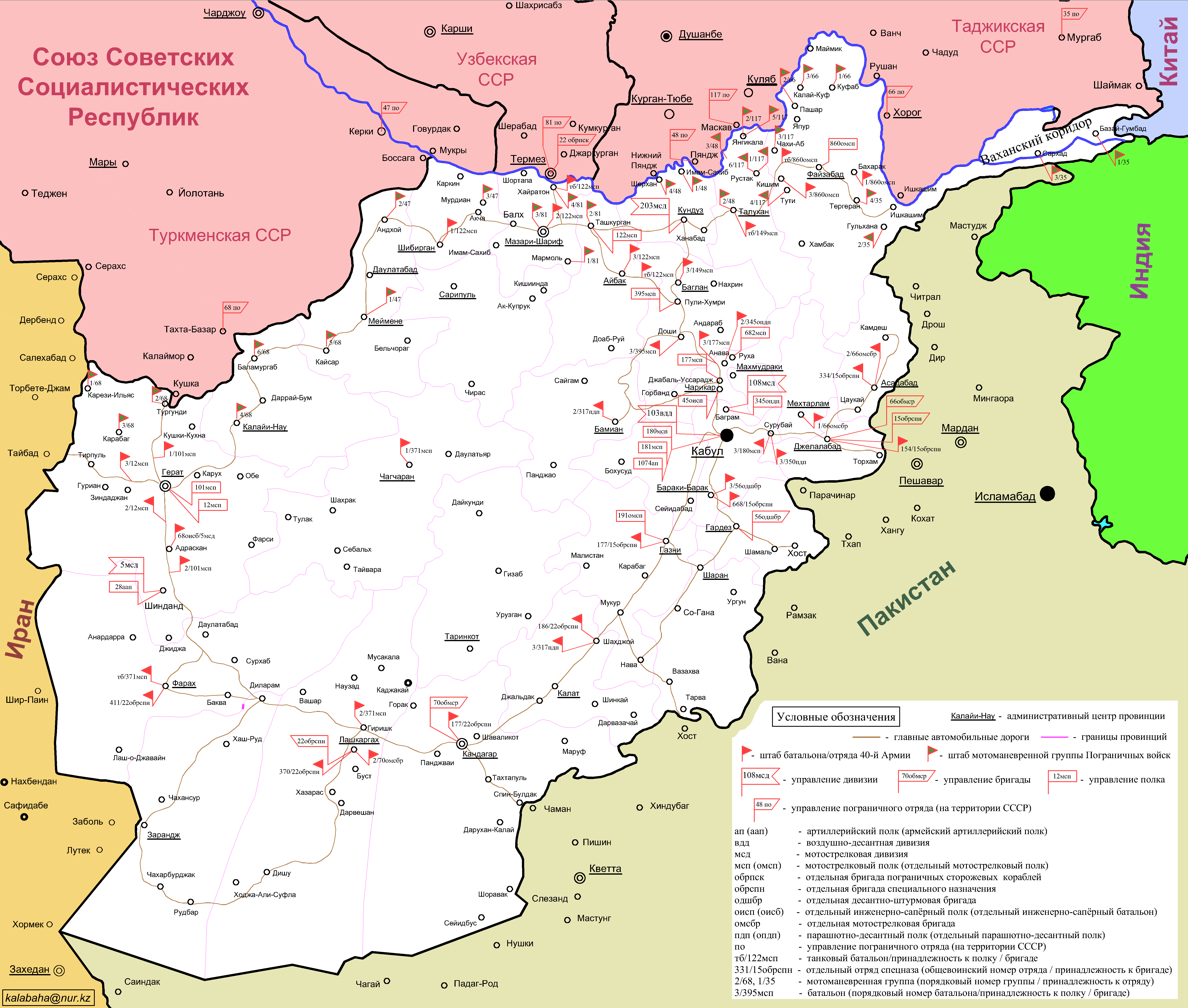
Bases of the 40th Army in Afghanistan (in Russian)

The Army was re-created on December 16, 1979, in the Turkestan Military District on the directive of the General Staff of the Soviet Armed Forces. Lieutenant General Yuri Tukharinov, the first deputy commander of the Turkestan MD, was appointed as the army commander. To cover the boundary with unstable Afghanistan, three motor rifle divisions (the 5th Guards, 108th and 68th) were deployed to the region. From December 3–16, 1979 two battalions of the 345th Independent Guards Airborne Regiment and the special operation GRU unit (Muslim battalion) were deployed to Bagram Airfield near Kabul as the situation in the Afghanistan had deteriorated.

On December 8, 1979, a meeting between Brezhnev, Andropov, Suslov, and Gromyko took place to discuss the situation in Afghanistan. In a couple of days, the Minister of Defence Marshal Dmitriy Ustinov communicated to the Chief of the General Staff Nikolai Ogarkov that the Politburo had adopted a decision on the temporary introduction of troops in the country and ordered to prepare somewhere around 75,000-80,000 concentration of force. Ustinov issued an oral order "No. 312/12/00133" on creation of a new general purpose army in the Turkestan MD. Only on December 12, 1979, the Politburo has officially adopted the decision on the introduction of the Soviet Army in Afghanistan. Next day an operative group of the Ministry of Defense was formed led by the deputy Chief of the General Staff General Sergei Akhromeyev, later replaced by the Marshal of the Soviet Union Sergei Sokolov. On December 14 at 22:00 the operative group arrived to Termez, Tajik SSR, the same day the special KGB group "Grom" arrived to Kabul to reinforce another group "Zenit-2".

The field headquarters of the army was deployed in the Turkestan MD, while its aviation support by the 34th Mixed Aviation Corps in the Turkestan MD. On December 24, 1979 Minister of Defense Ustinov officially announced about the adopted decision to invade Afghanistan and signed the directive #312/12/001. Next day there were deployed around 100 different units. Out of the reserves were drafted additional 50,000 people from the republics of Soviet Central Asia and the Kazakh SSR, some 8,000 units of automobiles were transferred out of the public sector.

=== Units ===
- 5th Guards Motor Rifle Zimovniki Division in Kushka
  - 101st Motor Rifle Regiment
  - 12th Guard Motor Rifle Regiment (introduced in March 1985)
  - 371st Guards Motor Rifle Berlin Regiment
  - 373rd Guards Motor Rifle Regiment (transformed into 70th Separate Guard Motor Rifle Brigade in March 1980)
  - 24th Guards Tank Paris Regiment (introduced in October 1986)
  - 1060th Artillery Regiment
  - 1008th Anti-Aircraft Artillery Regiment (transformed into 1122nd Anti-Aircraft Missile Regiment in February 1980)
  - 1122nd Anti-Aircraft Rocket Sevastopol Regiment (introduced in October 1986)
- 108th Motor Rifle Nevel Division in Termez
  - 177th Motor Rifle Dvina Regiment
  - 180th Motor Rifle Regiment
  - 181st Motor Rifle Regiment
  - 186th Motor Rifle Vyborg Regiment (in March 1980 transformed into 66th Separate Motor Rifle Brigade)
  - 285th Tank Uman-Warsaw Regiment (transferred from 201st Motor Rifle Gatchina Division, in March 1984 transformed into 682nd Motor Rifle Regiment)
  - 682nd Motor Rifle Uman-Warsaw Regiment
  - 1074th Lvov Artillery Regiment
  - 1049th Flak Artillery Regiment (introduced in November 1981)
  - 1415th Flak Missile Regiment (dropped in October 1986)
- 353rd Gun Artillery Brigade
- 2nd Anti-Aircraft Missile Brigade
- 56th Guards Air Assault Brigade
- 103rd Communications Regiment
- 28th Rocket Artillery Regiment
- 58th Motor Rifle Division (reserve)
- 103rd Guards Airborne Division
  - 317th Airborne Regiment
  - 350th Airborne Regiment
  - 357th Airborne Regiment
  - 1179th Artillery Regiment
- 345th Independent Guards Airborne Regiment

=== Turkestan MD Contingent ===
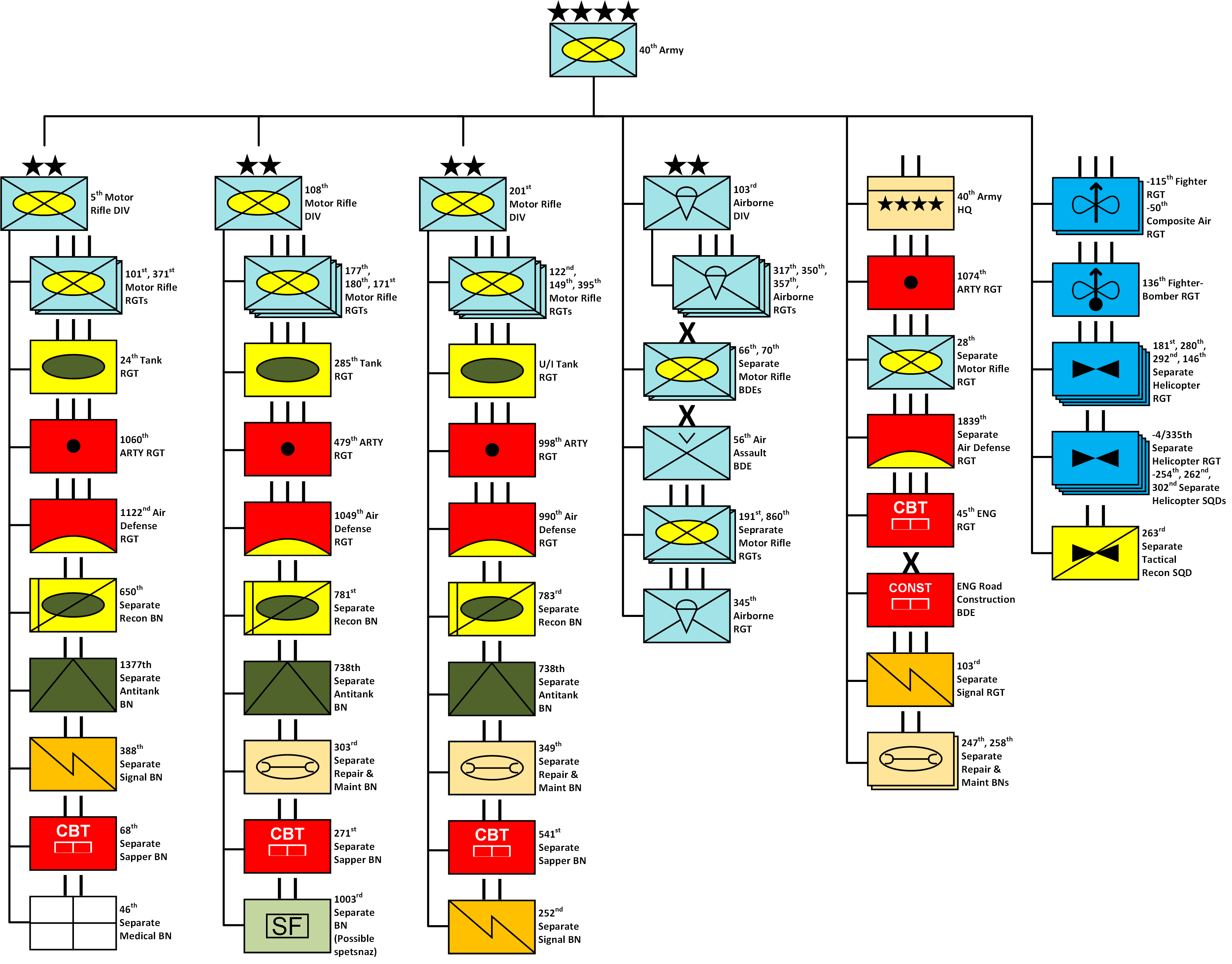
Soviet 40th Army in the opening days of the invasion of Afghanistan

- 860th Motor-Rifle Regiment
- 186th Motor-Rifle Regiment (former 108th Motor-Rifle Division)
- 68th Motor-Rifle Division (reserve)
- 201st Motor Rifle Division (reserve)

=== Air Forces ===
Eleven fighter aviation regiments (IAP), seven fighter-bomber aviation regiments (IBAP), a separate reconnaissance aviation regiment, a separate reconnaissance and tactical aviation squadron (ortae), several assault aviation regiments, a separate assault aviation squadron (oshae), a separate mixed aviation regiment (osap), 4 separate helicopter aviation regiments (OVAP), 6 separate helicopter aviation squadrons (OVAE) rotated through supporting Soviet forces in Afghanistan. Among those units were:

- 136th Fighter-Bomber Aviation Regiment (Sukhoi Su-17) deployed to Kandahar 1982-83, and 1986-87. Otherwise located at Chirchik, Turkestan Military District.
- 217th Fighter-Bomber Aviation Regiment
- 115th Guards Fighter Aviation Regiment
- 181st Helicopter Regiment
- 218th Helicopter Regiment
- 302nd Helicopter Squadron of the 5th Guard Motor-Rifle Division

The army entered Afghanistan (as part of the beginning of the Soviet–Afghan War) in December 1979 without the last division, but had the 201st Motor Rifle Division added to its composition during January 1980. Also with the force that entered Afghanistan were the 860th Motor Rifle Regiment, and the 56th Guards Air Assault Brigade. Later on the 201st and 58th Motor Rifle Divisions also entered the country, along with other smaller units.

The Limited Contingent of Soviet Troops in Afghanistan was formed on the basis of the Army Headquarters. The Limited Contingent also included the 34th Aviation Corps (Russian: 34-го смешанного авиакорпуса), special troops of combat support, special troops of logistics support, including the 159th Road Construction Brigade which became the 58th Automotive Brigade, the 276th Pipeline Brigade of the Pipeline Troops, and the 278th Road Commandant Brigade. The Road Troops first deployed a separate road commandant battalion (army) and then from 1983 the 278th Separate Road Commandant Brigade (278 odkbr) at Chaugani in Baghlan Province, carried out the operational maintenance of the army's highway from the Soviet-Afghan border at Hairatan to Kabul to Pul-e-Charkhi. There was also a large directorate of engineering for construction tasks, special forces of the KGB, a communications battalion of the KGB, elements of the KGB Border Troops, including six border detachments and three aviation regiments, a river patrol, and special purpose detachments of the Ministry of Internal Affairs.

There was a large ammunition depot at Puli Khumri, the 3704th Artillery Warehouse (3704 артиллерийский склад вооружения и боеприпасов, Military Unit Number в/ч 77824), which blew up spectacularly in 1988. From August 8-10, 1988, there were fires and explosions in the depot, located in the Kelgai Valley near the town. The detonation of the explosives storage facility, according to eyewitnesses, resembled a nuclear one with the appearance of a characteristic nuclear "mushroom cloud". Eight soldiers and one civilian cook may have been killed, with others wounded. Western sources reported that the Soviet Ministry of Foreign Affairs denied there had been any casualties.

Preparations for Soviet withdrawal from Afghanistan were underway by 1988. But due to attempts by the Najibullah Afghan government to retain at least part of the 40th Army in Afghanistan, little withdrawals were made from September to December 1988. The army's units continued to concentrate in the two largest garrisons (Kabul and Shindand), which were supposed to leave last, and along the highways along which it was supposed to withdraw troops (in the west, Shindand - Kushka, in the east, Kabul - Termez). After long negotiations between the Afghan and Soviet leaders, the requests to retain troops were rejected and on January 27, 1989, the withdrawal resumed. The 108th Motor Rifle Division served as the rearguard. The last Soviet units left Afghanistan in February 1989. Army commander Boris Gromov was the last Soviet soldier to cross back into the Soviet Union at Termez on 15 February 1989, covered by the reconnaissance battalion of the 201st Motor Rifle Division.

After the withdrawal from Afghanistan in 1989, 40th Army was reduced to 59th Army Corps.

All veterans that participated in the Afghanistan campaign were known as the Warriors-Internationalists (воинов-интернационалистов).

=== Commanders of the 40th Army ===
- Lieutenant General Yuri Tukharinov (May 1979 – 23 September 1980)
- Lieutenant General Boris Tkach (23 September 1980 – 7 May 1982)
- Lieutenant General Viktor Ermakov (7 May 1982 – 4 November 1983)
- Lieutenant General Leonid Generalov (4 November 1983 – 19 April 1985)
- Lieutenant General Igor Rodionov (19 April 1985 – 30 April 1986)
- Lieutenant General Viktor Dubynin (30 April 1986 – 1 June 1987)
- Lieutenant General Boris Gromov (1 June 1987 – 15 February 1989)

== Third formation and transfer to Kazakhstan ==
The Army Headquarters was disbanded on 15 February 1989, but then reorganised as HQ 59th Army Corps (V/Ch 05865) at Samarkand on 1 March 1989.

40th Army was again reformed on June 4, 1991, at Semipalatinsk from HQ 1st Army Corps (1988-1991, 1957-1981), which had been known during the 1980s as 32nd Army (1981-1988). Immediately prior to its dissolution in late 1992, the 40th Army consisted of the 78th Tank Division (Ayaguz); the 5202nd Base for Storage of Weapons and Equipment at Semipalatinsk (prior to 1989 – the 71st Motor Rifle Division); the 5203rd BKhVT Ust-Kamenogorsk (prior to 1989, the 155th Motor Rifle Division); the 5204th BKhVT at Karaganda (prior to 1989 – the 203rd Zaporozhye Khingan Motor Rifle Division), taken over by Kazakhstan on 7 May 1992, the 69th Tank Division (mobilisation) (Ust-Kamenogorsk), and the 10th Fortified Area. The 69th Tank Division and the 10th Fortified Area were both disbanded in 1992. With the dissolution of the Soviet Union the Army became part of the Armed Forces of the Republic of Kazakhstan and was redesignated the 1st Army Corps.

From September 1989 the Army commander was Lieutenant General Anatoliy Semenovich Ryabtsev (ru:Рябцев, Анатолий Семёнович). Moscow ITAR-TASS World Service in Russian of 0840 GMT 16 April 1992 reported that Ryabtsev was born in Rostov Oblast. He had graduated from the Ulyanovsk Tank School and the Armored Tank Troops and General Staff Academies. He had commanded a regiment, division, and, from 1989, the 40th Army. [The 40th Army] 'is now under the jurisdiction of Kazakhstan.' Apparently there was a struggle in early 1992 between Ryabtsev and Colonel General Georgy Kondratyev, the commander of the Turkestan Military District. "By February 1992, Ryabtsev finally ceased to obey the administration of the district, and in particular to me, as commander. And then he sent a telegram that he was no longer subordinate to the TurkVO and was subordinate only to the President of Kazakhstan, Nazarbayev." Kondratyev got the Military Council of the Turkestan Military District to petition the Soviet Minister of Defence to remove Ryabtsev from the post of army commander. But Ryabtsev complained to Nazerbayev, who cancelled the order.

== Notes ==
=== Bibliography ===
- Erickson, John (1975). The Road to Stalingrad. London: Weidenfeld & Nicolson.
  - Erickson, John (2003). The Road to Stalingrad. (paperback edition)
- Feskov, V.I.; Golikov, V.I.; Kalashnikov, K.A.; Slugin, S.A. (2013). Вооруженные силы СССР после Второй Мировой войны: от Красной Армии к Советской [The Armed Forces of the USSR after World War II: From the Red Army to the Soviet: Part 1 Land Forces] (in Russian). Tomsk: Scientific and Technical Literature Publishing. ISBN 9785895035306.
- Malashenko, Ye. I. (2004). "Movement to contact and commitment to combat of reserve fronts". Military Thought. Archived from the original on March 21, 2006. "Military Thought" is the military-theoretical journal of the Russian Ministry of Defence.
- Staskov, Nikolai Viktorovich (July 2003). "Dnepr airborne operation: lessons and conclusions". Military Thought. 12 (4).
- Volkov, A. (2012-01-06). "40-я Армия: история создания, состав, изменение структуры" [40th Army: history of establishment, composition, changes in structure]. Archived from the original on 2012-01-06.
