= French Division 3 =

French Division 3 may refer to:

- Ligue 3 (2026–present), current third tier of the French football pyramid
- French Division 3 (1971–1993), former third tier of the French football pyramid
- 1936–37 Division Régionale, single season of French third-tier football

== See also ==
- French Division 4 (disambiguation)
