= 4th Brigade =

In military terms, 4th Brigade may refer to:

== Argentina ==
- IV Airborne Brigade (Argentina)

== Australia ==
- 4th Brigade (Australia)
- 4th Armoured Brigade (Australia)
- 4th Light Horse Brigade
- 4th Motor Brigade (Australia)

== Biafra ==
- 4th Commando Brigade (Biafra)

== British India ==
- 4th Indian Infantry Brigade
- 4th (Secunderabad) Cavalry Brigade
- 4th (Rawalpindi) Brigade

== Canada ==
- 4th Canadian Armoured Brigade
- 4th Canadian Infantry Brigade
- 4th Infantry Brigade (Canada)
- 4 Canadian Mechanized Brigade Group

== China ==
- 4th Armored Brigade (People's Republic of China)

== Croatia ==
- 4th Guards Brigade (Croatia)

== Czech Republic ==
- 4th Rapid Deployment Brigade (Czech Republic)

== France ==
- 4th Airmobile Brigade (France)

== Georgia ==
- 4th Infantry Brigade (Georgia)

== Germany ==
- 4th SS Panzer Grenadier Brigade Netherlands

== Greece ==
- 4th Infantry Brigade (Greece)

== Iran ==
- 4th Marine Brigade (Iran)

== Ireland ==
- 4th Brigade (Ireland)

== Israel ==
- 4th Armored Brigade "Kiryati"

== Japan ==
- 4th Cavalry Brigade (Imperial Japanese Army)
- 4th Mixed Brigade (Imperial Japanese Army)

== Kazakhstan ==
- 4th Mechanized Brigade (Kazakhstan)

== Lebanon ==
- 4th Infantry Brigade (Lebanon)

== New Zealand ==
- 4th Infantry Brigade (New Zealand)
- 4th New Zealand Armoured Brigade

== Poland ==
- 4th Cavalry Brigade (Poland)

== Romania ==
- 4th Engineer Brigade (Romania)

== Russia ==
- 4th Rocket Brigade
- 4th Separate Guards Motor Rifle Brigade

== Serbia ==
- 4th Army Brigade

== South Africa ==
- 4th Infantry Brigade (South Africa)

== Sweden ==
- Skaraborg Brigade

== Turkey ==
- 4th Commando Brigade (Turkey)
- 4th Mechanised Infantry Brigade (Turkey)

== Ukraine ==
- 4th Heavy Mechanized Brigade

== United Kingdom ==
- 4th Anti-Aircraft Brigade (United Kingdom)
- 4th Armoured Brigade (United Kingdom), 1939–1945
- 4th Cavalry Brigade (United Kingdom)
- 4th Guards Brigade (United Kingdom)
- 4th Infantry Brigade (United Kingdom)
- 4th Light Brigade (United Kingdom)
- 4th London Infantry Brigade
- 4th (London) Mounted Brigade
- 4th Mechanized Brigade (United Kingdom)
- 4th Mounted Brigade (United Kingdom)
- 4th Parachute Brigade (United Kingdom)
- 4th Provisional Brigade (United Kingdom)
- 4th Reserve Brigade
- 4th Special Service Brigade

=== Artillery units ===
- 4th Brigade Royal Field Artillery
- 4th County of London Brigade, Royal Field Artillery
- 4th East Anglian Brigade, Royal Field Artillery
- 4th Home Counties Brigade, Royal Field Artillery
- 4th Lowland Brigade, Royal Field Artillery
- 4th Northumbrian (County of Durham) Brigade, Royal Field Artillery
- 4th North Midland Brigade, Royal Field Artillery
- 4th South Midland Brigade, Royal Field Artillery
- 4th East Lancashire (Howitzer) Brigade, Royal Field Artillery
- 4th West Lancashire Medium Brigade, Royal Garrison Artillery
- 4th Brigade, Welsh Division, Royal Artillery
- 4th Welsh Brigade, Royal Field Artillery
- 4th West Riding Brigade, Royal Field Artillery
- 4th Wessex Brigade, Royal Field Artillery
- 4th Highland (Mountain) Brigade, Royal Garrison Artillery
- 4th Brigade, Northern Division, Royal Artillery
- 4th Brigade, North Irish Division, Royal Artillery
- 4th Brigade, Scottish Division, Royal Artillery
- IV Brigade, Royal Horse Artillery
- IV Brigade, Royal Horse Artillery (T.F.), Territorial Force

== United States ==
- 4th Brigade, 1st Cavalry Division (United States)
- 4th Brigade, 1st Infantry Division (United States)
- 4th Brigade, 104th Division (United States)
- 4th Cavalry Brigade (United States)
- 4th Combat Aviation Brigade
- 4th Maneuver Enhancement Brigade
- 4th Marine Expeditionary Brigade
- 4th Medical Brigade
- 4th Reserve Officers' Training Corps Brigade
- 4th Security Force Assistance Brigade
- 4th Sustainment Brigade

=== Brigade Combat Teams ===
- 4th Brigade Combat Team, 1st Armored Division
- 4th Brigade Combat Team, 1st Cavalry Division
- 4th Brigade Combat Team, 1st Infantry Division
- 4th Brigade Combat Team, 2nd Infantry Division
- 4th Brigade Combat Team, 3rd Infantry Division
- 4th Brigade Combat Team, 4th Infantry Division
- 4th Brigade Combat Team, 10th Mountain Division
- 4th Brigade Combat Team, 82nd Airborne Division
- 4th Brigade Combat Team, 101st Airborne Division

== See also ==
- 4th Division (disambiguation)
- 4th Regiment (disambiguation)
