= 4th Engineer Brigade =

The 4th Territorial Engineer Brigade (Brigada 4 Geniu) was an engineer brigade of the Romanian Land Forces. The unit was redesignated as the 4th Engineer Battalion in 2006. It is currently subordinated to the 4th Infantry Division and its headquarters are located in Deva.

== Structure (2006) ==
- 4th Engineer Brigade - Deva
  - 52nd Engineer Battalion - Satu Mare
  - 136th Bridges Battalion - Alba Iulia
