= 4th Carrier Division =

Unit of the Imperial Japanese Navy

Fourth Carrier Division
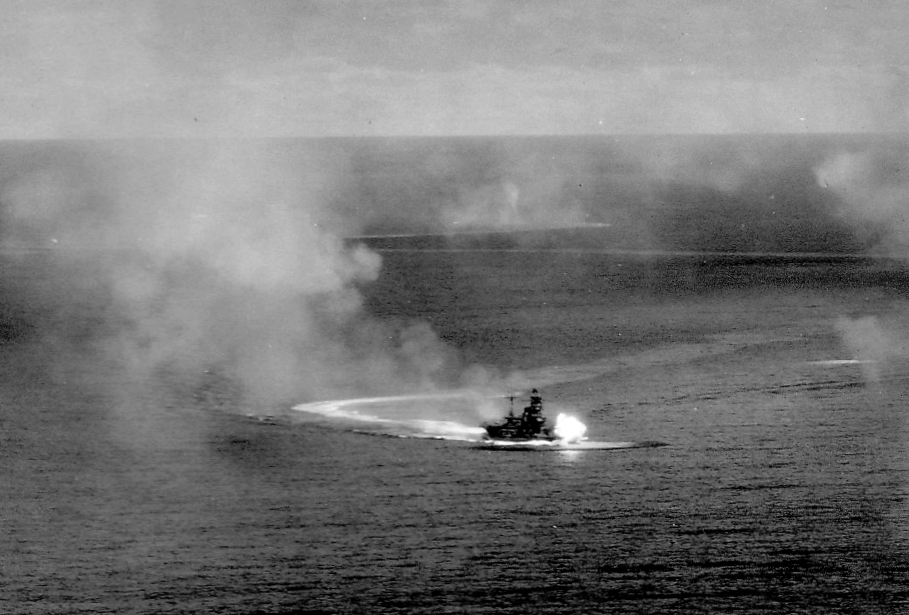
- Ise in October 1944, during the Battle off Cape Engaño
- Active: December 1, 1937 – July 14, 1942; May 1, 1944 – March 1, 1945
- Country: Empire of Japan
- Allegiance: Axis Powers of World War II
- Branch: Imperial Japanese Navy
- Type: Naval aviation unit
- Role: Aircraft carrier support
- Engagements: World War II; Pacific Theater; Battle of the Coral Sea; Operation Kita; Philippines campaign; Battle of Leyte Gulf; Aleutian Islands Campaign; Battle of Dutch Harbor

Commanders
- Notable commanders: Kakuji Kakuta

Insignia
- Identification symbol: Notoro 1937; Notoro (ノトロ); Ryūjō 1941–42; DI-xxx; Taiyō, Shōhō, Jun'yō 1941-42; DII-xxx; May 1944; 634-xxx

The 4th Carrier Division (第四航空戦隊, Dai Yon Kōkū Sentai, or Yon Kōsen) was a seaplane tender and aircraft carrier unit of the Imperial Japanese Navy's Combined Fleet.

== Organization ==
Date	Higher unit	Ships and air units
1 December 1937 (original)	Combined Fleet	Notoro, Kinugasa Maru
1 August 1938	disbanded	
1 April 1941	1st Air Fleet	Ryūjō
11 August 1941	1st Air Fleet	Ryūjō, Destroyer Squadron 3 : Shiokaze, Hokaze
10 December 1941	1st Air Fleet	Ryūjō, Kasuga Maru (Taiyō), Destroyer Squadron 3 : Shiokaze, Hokaze
1 April 1942	1st Air Fleet	Ryūjō, Shōhō
3 May 1942	1st Air Fleet	Ryūjō, Shōhō, Jun'yō
20 May 1942	1st Air Fleet	Ryūjō, Jun'yō
14 July 1942	disbanded	
1 May 1944	3rd Fleet	Hyūga, Ise, 634th Naval Air Group
15 October 1944	3rd Fleet	Jun'yō, Ryūhō, Hyūga, Ise
(24 October 1944)	3rd Fleet	Hyūga, Ise
15 December 1944	2nd Fleet	Hyūga, Ise
1 March 1945	disbanded	

== Commander ==
	Rank	Name	Date
1	R.ADM	Tomoshige Samejima	1 December 1937
x		disbanded	1 August 1938
x		vacant post	1 April 1941
2	R.ADM	Torao Kuwabara	10 April 1941
3	R.ADM	Kakuji Kakuta	1 September 1941
x		disbanded	14 July 1942
4	R.ADM	Chiaki Matsuda	1 May 1944
x		disbanded	1 March 1945

== Bibliography ==
- "Monthly The Maru" series, and "The Maru Special" series, "Ushio Shobō". (Japan)
- "Monthly Ships of the World" series, "Kaijinsha". (Japan)
- "Famous Airplanes of the World" series and "Monthly Kōku Fan" series, Bunrindō (Japan)
