= 4th Antiaircraft Missile Division =

3rd Training Base (1959-64) 4th Independent Anti-Aircraft Artillery Division (1964-76) 4th Anti-Aircraft Missile Division (1976-85) 14th Anti-Aircraft Missile Brigade (1985-94) 4th Anti-Aircraft Missile Division (1994-)
- Active: 1959.5.12 -
- Country: People's Republic of China
- Branch: People's Liberation Army Air Force
- Type: Division
- Role: Air Defense
- Garrison/HQ: Huairou District, Beijing

3rd Training Base of the Air Force (Chinese: 空军第3训练基地) was a formation of the People's Liberation Army Air Force of People's Republic of China. It was activated in Daxing District, Beijing from Headquarters, 106th Anti-Aircraft Artillery Division and 1st Independent Anti-Aircraft Artillery Battalion which equipped with SA-2 Guideline missile. The training base was also attached by 2nd and 3rd Independent AAA Battalions, which also equipped with SA-2s.

On March 1, 1964, the training base was reorganized into 4th Independent Anti-Aircraft Artillery Division of the Air Force (Chinese: 空军独立高炮第4师). The division was then composed of 1st, 2nd, 3rd, 4th and 5th independent AAA battalions, all equipped with SA-2. The division was subordinated to Air Force of Beijing Military Region.

From April 7, 1965, to December 1967 the division was transferred to headquarters of PLAAF's control before it was returned to Air Force of Beijing MR.

On March 1, 1976, the division was renamed as 4th Anti-Aircraft Missile Division of the Air Force (Chinese: 空军地空导弹第4师). The division was then composed of 22nd, 23rd and 24th anti-aircraft missile regiments.

On September 10, 1985, the division was reduced to 14th Anti-Aircraft Missile Brigade of the Air Force (Chinese: 空军地空导弹第14旅).

In 1994, the division was re-expanded to 4th Anti-Aircraft Missile Division of the Air Force (Chinese: 空军地空导弹第4师).

== Air defense victories ==
Time	Place	SAM Unit	SAM Type	Victim	Pilot(s)	Faction	Unit	Consequence	Notes
1959.10.7	Tongzhou, Beijing	2nd Independent AAA Battalion	SA-2	RB-57D "5643"	Capt Ying-Chin Wang	ROC Air Force	4th Squadron	Destroyed, pilot KIA	First SAM kill in history
1962.9.9	Nanchang, Jiangxi	2nd Independent AAA Battalion	SA-2	U-2C "178"	Lt.Col Huai-Sheng Chen	ROC Air Force	35th Squadron	Destroyed, pilot KIA	
1963.11.1	Yingtan, Jiangxi	2nd Independent AAA Battalion	SA-2	U-2C "335"	Major Chang-Li Yeh	ROC Air Force	35th Squadron	Destroyed, pilot POW	
1964.7.7	Chenghai, Fujian	2nd Independent AAA Battalion	SA-2	U-2G "362"	Lt.Col Nanping Lee	ROC Air Force	35th Squadron	Destroyed, pilot KIA	
1965.1.10	Baotou, Inner Mongolia	1st Independent AAA Battalion	SA-2	U-2C "358"	Major Liyi Chang	ROC Air Force	35th Squadron	Destroyed, pilot POW	
1967.9.17	Dongxing, Guangxi	3rd Independent AAA Battalion	SA-2	Ryan 147H/T	W/O	United States Air Force	N/A	Destroyed	
1968.3.22	Ningming, Guangxi	2nd Independent AAA Battalion	SA-2	Ryan 147H/T	W/O	United States Air Force	N/A	Destroyed	
1984.3.18	Guangxi	50th Battalion, 11th AA Missile Regiment	HQ-2	MiG-21R	N/A	Vietnam People's Air Force	N/A	Damaged	

== Current structure (2010) ==
4th Anti-Aircraft Missile Division - Huairou District, Beijing

- 2nd Anti-Aircraft Missile Regiment - Chengde, Hebei
  - 35th AA Missile Battalion (HQ-2) - ?
  - 69th AA Missile Battalion (HQ-2) - 40°57′09.1″N 118°16′40.8″E
  - 82nd AA Missile Battalion (HQ-2) - 40°53′39.0″N 116°59′15.0″E
  - 112th AA Missile Battalion (HQ-2) - 40°57′39.2″N 117°44′37.1″E
- 11th Anti-Aircraft Missile Regiment - Miyun District, Beijing
  - 41st AA Missile Battalion (S-300) - 39°54′35.8″N 117°43′05.4″E
  - 50th AA Missile Battalion (S-300) - ?
  - 85th AA Missile Battalion (S-300) - 40°06′55.0″N 116°59′22.1″E
- 12th Anti-Aircraft Missile Regiment - Huairou District, Beijing
  - 2nd AA Missile Battalion (HQ-9) - 40°21′20.7″N 116°41′01.1″E
  - 80th AA Missile Battalion (HQ-9) - ?
  - 83rd AA Missile Battalion (HQ-9) - 40°12′36.1″N 116°51′02.6″E
  - 84th AA Missile Battalion (HQ-9) - 40°21′33.1″N 116°21′08.5″E

Units marked with "?" do not appear on Satellite map as of 2018.
