= 4th North African Infantry Division =

The 4th North African Infantry Division was a French Army formation established in 1937.

During the Battle of France in May 1940 the division was made up of the following units:

The Division was created in August 1938 and was dissolved in May 1940 following the invasion of France. The Division was commanded by General Charles Sancelme.

- 13th Zouaves Regiment
- 23rd Algerian Tirailleurs Regiment
- 25th Algerian Tirailleurs Regiment
- 94th Reconnaissance Battalion
- 33rd Colonial Artillery Regiment
- 233rd Colonial Artillery Regiment

It was an active division which existed during peacetime. The Tirailleurs Regiments were made up of native troops from Algeria. The Zouaves Regiment was made up from European settlers in North Africa and some recruited from France.
