= Dublin City Artillery Militia =

Auxiliary unit of the British Army

Dublin City Artillery Militia 4th Brigade, North Irish Division, RA Dublin City Artillery (Southern Division) RA Dublin City Royal Garrison Artillery (M)
- Active: 1854–1909
- Country: United Kingdom
- Branch: Militia
- Role: Garrison Artillery; Field Artillery; Position Artillery
- Part of: North Irish Division, RA (1882–89); Southern Division, RA (1889–1902)
- Garrison/HQ: Lucan (1854–61); Dublin (1861–1909)

The Dublin City Artillery Militia was a part-time reserve unit of Britain's Royal Artillery based in Dublin, Ireland, from 1854 to 1909.

== Background ==
The long-standing national Militia of the United Kingdom was revived by the Militia Act 1852, enacted during a period of international tension. As before, units were raised and administered on a county basis, and filled by voluntary enlistment (although conscription by means of the Militia Ballot might be used if the counties failed to meet their quotas). Training was for 56 days on enlistment, then for 21–28 days per year, during which the men received full army pay. Under the Act, Militia units could be embodied by Royal Proclamation for full-time home defence service in three circumstances:

1. 'Whenever a state of war exists between Her Majesty and any foreign power'.
2. 'In all cases of invasion or upon imminent danger thereof'.
3. 'In all cases of rebellion or insurrection'.

The 1852 Act introduced Militia Artillery units in addition to the traditional infantry regiments. Their role was to man coastal defences and fortifications, relieving the Royal Artillery (RA) for active service.

== History ==
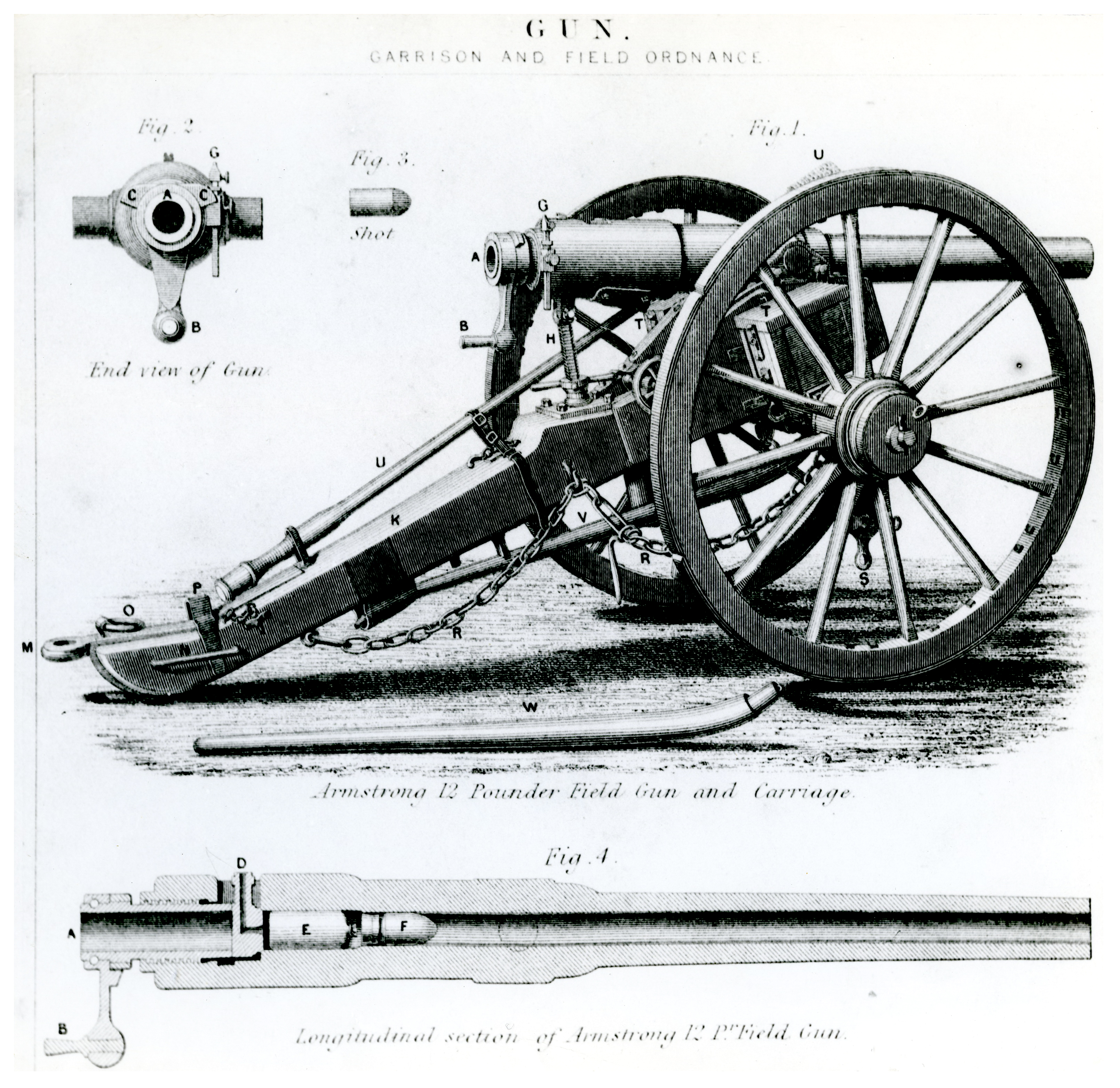
12-pounder RBL field gun

The unit was raised in Dublin in December 1854 under the title of Dublin City Artillery Militia. The first commanding officer (CO), appointed on 17 November 1854, was Lieutenant-Colonel-Commandant the Hon. Robert French Handcock, son of Lord Castlemaine and a Half-pay RA Captain.

At first the headquarters (HQ) was at Lucan, Dublin, transferring to Dublin City in 1861. Training of the Irish Militia was suspended in 1866. When training resumed in 1871 the acting CO following Handcock's death was Major Francis de Burgh, who was promoted to Lt-Col on 17 December that year. Longstanding officers of the unit continued to be promoted to the command: Lt-Col W.J.N. Magill on 31 August 1878, Lt-Col W.C. Dickenson on 18 November 1896, and Lt-Col William L. Smythe on 14 February 1903.

Following the Cardwell Reforms a mobilisation scheme began to appear in the Army List from December 1875. This assigned places in an order of battle of the 'Garrison Army' to Militia Artillery units: the Dublin City Artillery's war station was in the Plymouth defences.

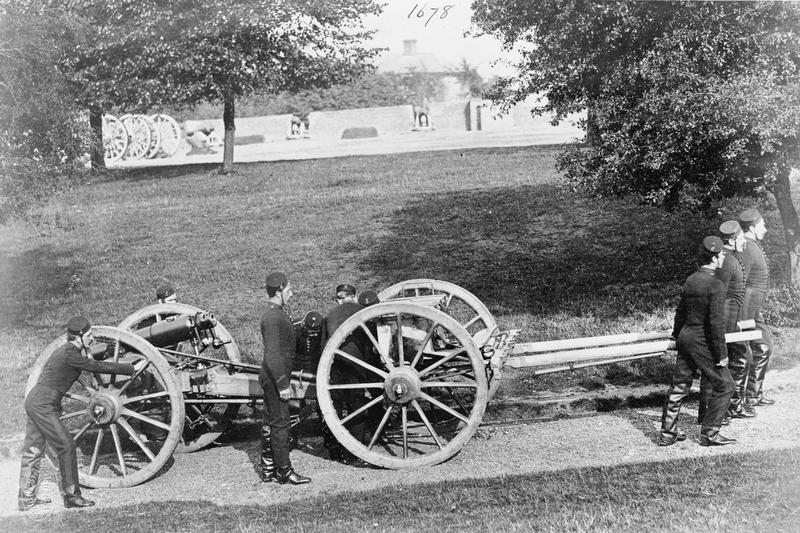
RA gunners train with a 12-pounder.

The Artillery Militia was reorganised into 11 divisions of garrison artillery in 1882, and the Dublin City unit became the 4th Brigade, North Irish Division, RA. When the North Irish Division was abolished in 1889 the title was altered to Dublin City Artillery (Southern Division) RA.

In 1898 the unit was reorganised, with three companies becoming field artillery batteries armed with 12-pounder RBL guns, the other two companies becoming 'position artillery' (semi-mobile heavy field artillery) armed with 40-pounder RBL guns.

From 1902 most units of the Militia artillery formally became part of the Royal Garrison Artillery, the Dublin unit taking the title of 'Dublin City RGA (M).

== Embodiments ==
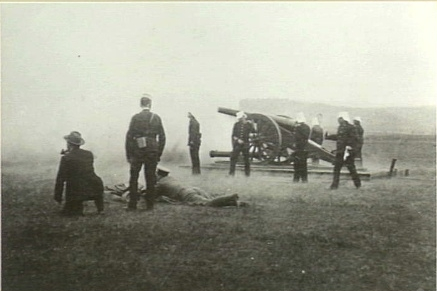
Volunteers train with a 40-pounder.

The unit was embodied for home defence three times:

- Crimean War: February 1855 to September 1856
- Indian Mutiny: 2 April 1859 to 29 November 1860. The unit was embodied at Dublin and then crossed to England, first being stationed at Colchester, then at Shorncliffe before returning to Colchester and then moving to Plymouth for the winter. Early in 1860 the corps returned to Colchester before moving to Woolwich and then being stationed in the Portsmouth area including Gosport and Haslar until it returned to Dublin to be disembodied.
- Second Boer War: 9 May to 6 November 1900

== Disbandment ==
After the Boer War, the future of the Militia was called into question. There were moves to reform the Auxiliary Forces (Militia, Yeomanry and Volunteers) to take their place in the six Army Corps proposed by St John Brodrick as Secretary of State for War. Some batteries of Militia Artillery were to be converted to field artillery. However, little of Brodrick's scheme was carried out.

Under the sweeping Haldane Reforms of 1908, the Militia was replaced by the Special Reserve, a semi-professional force whose role was to provide reinforcement drafts for Regular units serving overseas in wartime. Although the majority of the officers and men of the Dublin City RGA (M) accepted transfer to the Special Reserve Royal Field Artillery, becoming the Dublin City Royal Field Reserve Artillery on 30 August 1908, all these units were scrapped in 1909, the Dublin unit disbanding on 11 December. Instead the men of the RFA Special Reserve would form Brigade Ammunition Columns for the Regular RFA brigades on the outbreak of war.

== Honorary Colonels ==
Edward Guinness, Viscount Iveagh, KP, was appointed as Honorary Colonel of the unit on 10 May 1899.

== Notes ==
- Burke's Peerage, Baronetage and Knightage, 100th Edn, London, 1953.
- Col John K. Dunlop, The Development of the British Army 1899–1914, London: Methuen, 1938.
- Brig-Gen Sir James E. Edmonds, History of the Great War: Military Operations, France and Belgium, 1914, Vol I, 3rd Edn, London: Macmillan,1933/Woking: Shearer, 1986, ISBN 0-946998-01-9.
- J.B.M. Frederick, Lineage Book of British Land Forces 1660–1978, Vol II, Wakefield: Microform Academic, 1984, ISBN 1-85117-009-X.
- Lt-Col James Moncrieff Grierson (Col Peter S. Walton, ed.), Scarlet into Khaki: The British Army on the Eve of the Boer War, London: Sampson Low, 1899/London: Greenhill, 1988, ISBN 0-947898-81-6.
- Col George Jackson Hay, An Epitomized History of the Militia (The Constitutional Force), London: United Service Gazette, 1905/Ray Westlake Military Books, 1987, ISBN 0-9508530-7-0/Uckfield: Naval & Military Press, 2015 ISBN 978-1-78331-171-2.
- Norman E.H. Litchfield, The Militia Artillery 1852–1909 (Their Lineage, Uniforms and Badges), Nottingham: Sherwood Press, 1987, ISBN 0-9508205-1-2.
- Edward M. Spiers, The Army and Society 1815–1914, London: Longmans, 1980, ISBN 0-582-48565-7.
- Edward M. Spiers, The Late Victorian Army 1868–1902, Manchester: Manchester University Press, 1992/Sandpiper Books, 1999, ISBN 0-7190-2659-8.
