= 4th Battalion, 227th Aviation Regiment =

4–227th ARB
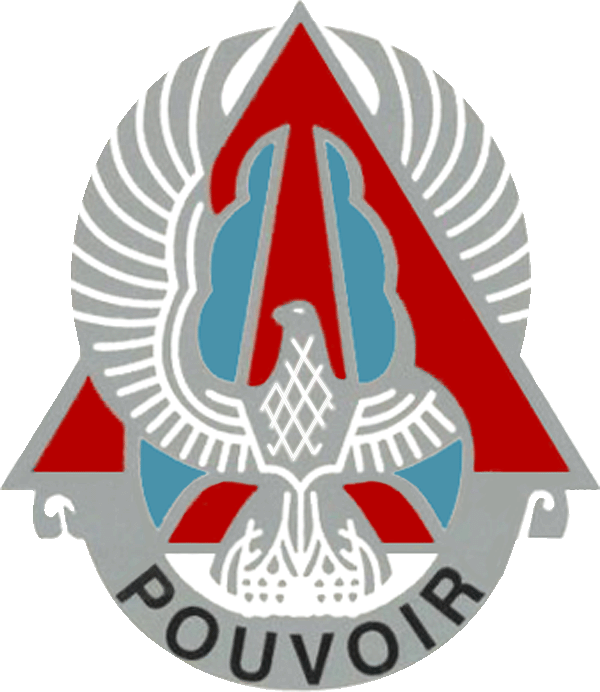
- 227th Aviation Regiment Insignia
- Active: 31 August 1920 – Present
- Allegiance: United States
- Role: Attack Reconnaissance Battalion; Support ground units with reconnaissance, anti-personnel, and anti-armor firepower.
- Part of: 1st Cavalry Division; U.S. Army III Corps
- Garrison/HQ: Fort Hood, Texas
- Nickname: Guns
- Motto: "GUNS ATTACK"
- Engagements: Vietnam War; Operation Desert Storm; Operation Iraqi Freedom

Commanders
- Current commander: LTC Randall Haws

The 4th Battalion 227th Aviation Regiment is an attack reconnaissance battalion, also known as 4-227 ARB supporting the 1st Cavalry Division. They fly the AH-64D Apache Longbow and are based at Fort Hood, Texas.

The history of the 4th Battalion can be traced back to Vietnam. It traces its history back to early 1963, where the Army began to gather helicopters into the 11th Air Assault Division to test the airmobile concept. Shortly thereafter, they were reassigned to the 1st Cavalry Division. On 1 August 1965, the 1st Cavalry Division was sent to Vietnam. Aviators participated in 14 Campaigns and received seven decorations including the Presidential Unit Citation (2 awards), the Valorous Unit Award (3 awards), the Meritorious Unit Commendation, the Republic of Vietnam Cross of Gallantry with Palm (3 awards) and the Republic of Vietnam Civil Action Honour Medal, First Class during its 7 years of duty in Vietnam. The first Army aviator to win the Medal of Honour in the Vietnam War was a member of the 227th Aviation Battalion.

The 4th Battalion 227th ARB was reactivated on 15 November 2005 and assigned to the First Cavalry Division on Fort Hood, Texas. They were assigned to the 1st Air Cavalry Brigade. The "Guns Attack" battalion was deployed to Iraq as part of Operation Iraqi Freedom 06–08. The battalion served for 15 months in Iraq. There are 6 companies inside the battalion A Co, B Co, C Co, D Co, E Co, and HHC.

== History ==
The 4–227th Attack Reconnaissance Battalion traces its origins to two distinct lineages: the regimental affiliation with the 227th AVN REGT and its roots as the Army's first armed helicopter unit- the Utility Tactical Transport Company (UTT)- known simply as "First with Guns!”. Constituted on 15 July 1961, BG Joe Stilwell. Jr. led the UTT to develop attack helicopter tactics- evolutionary concepts as relevant today as they were innovative then. The UTT was re-flagged on several occasions in Viet Nam: in August 1964, as the 68th Armed Helicopter Company (AHC); in MAR 1965, as the 197th AHC; and in September 1966, as the 334th AHC- the first AHC in Viet Nam equipped with the advanced AH-1G Cobra.

During the same period, the battalion's regimental roots were constituted on 1 February 1963 as Company D, 227th Aviation Battalion, an aerial weapons company assigned to the 11th Air Assault Division. On 1 July 1965, it was reorganized and re-designated as Company D, 227th Aviation Battalion, 1st Cavalry Division. The D Company "Guns" served valorously in support of 1st Cavalry Division operations, in Viet Nam, until it was inactivated on 30 August 1971. The unit was awarded two Presidential Unit Citations and two Valorous Unit Awards for its sustained actions in the A-Shau Valley, and the provinces of Pleiku Binh Thuan, and Bien Hoa, from 1966 to 1971.

While the Guns of 227th inactivated, the Guns of the 334th AHC deployed to Hanau, Germany, in 1973, and were later re-flagged the 503rd Aviation Battalion. The units of the 503rd would ultimately re-flag as AH64 units in the 227th AVN REGT, sustaining the First with Guns lineage in Europe. Back at Fort Hood, D Company, 227th was re-activated on 16 July 1987, deploying with the Division to Operations Desert Shield and Desert Storm, in support of the Defense of Saudi Arabia and the Liberation of Kuwait.

The Unit was again reorganized and re-designated, on 16 November 1993 as the 4th Battalion, 227th Aviation Regiment at Fort Hood, TX, serving the Division proudly until its deactivation as a regular Army unit on 15 February 1997. During this Aviation Restructuring Initiative, the Army also downsized the 2nd and 3rd (AH-64) Battalions of the 227th AVN REGT, activating the 1–501st AVN REGT (ATK) at Hanau, Germany as part of the 1st Armored Division. Following distinguished tours to Bosnia and Kosovo, the battalion deployed on a 15-month combat tour to Operation Iraqi Freedom, in April 2003, earning the Valorous Unit Award for its actions in the Baghdad area of operations.

In 2005, the 1–501st ATK deployed from Germany to Fort Hood to undergo the AH-64D Unit and Fielding Training Program and re-join the 1st Cavalry Division. The Guns deployed to OIF 06–08 with the First Team on 24 September 2006 and conducted sustained attack and reconnaissance operations for 15 months over Baghdad, in support of MND-B and MND-C. The unit received the "Meritorious Unit Citation" For its action in the Battle of Najaf in 2007. The unit redeployed to Texas in January 2008. The unit was then deployed again to Iraq in April 2009 and earned another Valorious Unit Award.

== Companies ==
Company
Headquarters and Headquarters Company "Bounty Hunters"
A Company "Panthers"
B Company "Diamondbacks"
C Company "Snake Eyes"
D Company "Unforgiven"
E Company "Equalizers"

== See also ==
- List of United States Army aircraft battalions
