= 4th Light Cavalry Division =

WW2 French Army formation

The 4th Light Cavalry Division (French: 4e Division Légère de Cavalerie, 4e DLC) was a French Army division active during World War II.

== World War 2 ==
=== Battle Of France ===
During the Battle of France in May 1940 the division contained the following units:

- 4th Cavalry Brigade
  - 8th Dragoon Regiment (8e Régiment de Dragons)
  - 31st Dragoon Regiment (31e Régiment de Dragons)
- 14th Light Mechanized Brigade
  - 4th Armoured Car Regiment (4ème Régiment de Véhicules Blindés)
  - 14th Dragoon Regiment (14e Régiment de Dragons Mécanisés)
- 77th Divisionary Light Cavalry Artillery Regiment (77e Régiment d’Artillerie de Division Légère de Cavalerie)

It was a newly formed division.
