= 4th Maneuver Enhancement Brigade =

Former United States Army brigade

- 4th Maneuver Enhancement Brigade shoulder sleeve insignia
- Active: 1 October 2008– 17 June 2015
- Country: United States
- Branch: U.S. Army
- Size: Brigade
- Part of: 1st Infantry Division, FORSCOM
- Garrison/HQ: Fort Leonard Wood
- Motto: Dauntless
- Colors: Teal Blue and Gold
- Anniversaries: 16 October 2008 Activation; 17 June 2015 Inactivation

Insignia
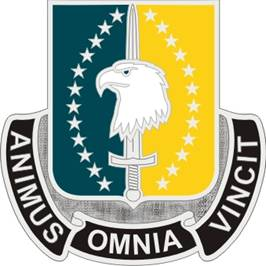
- Distinctive Unit Insignia

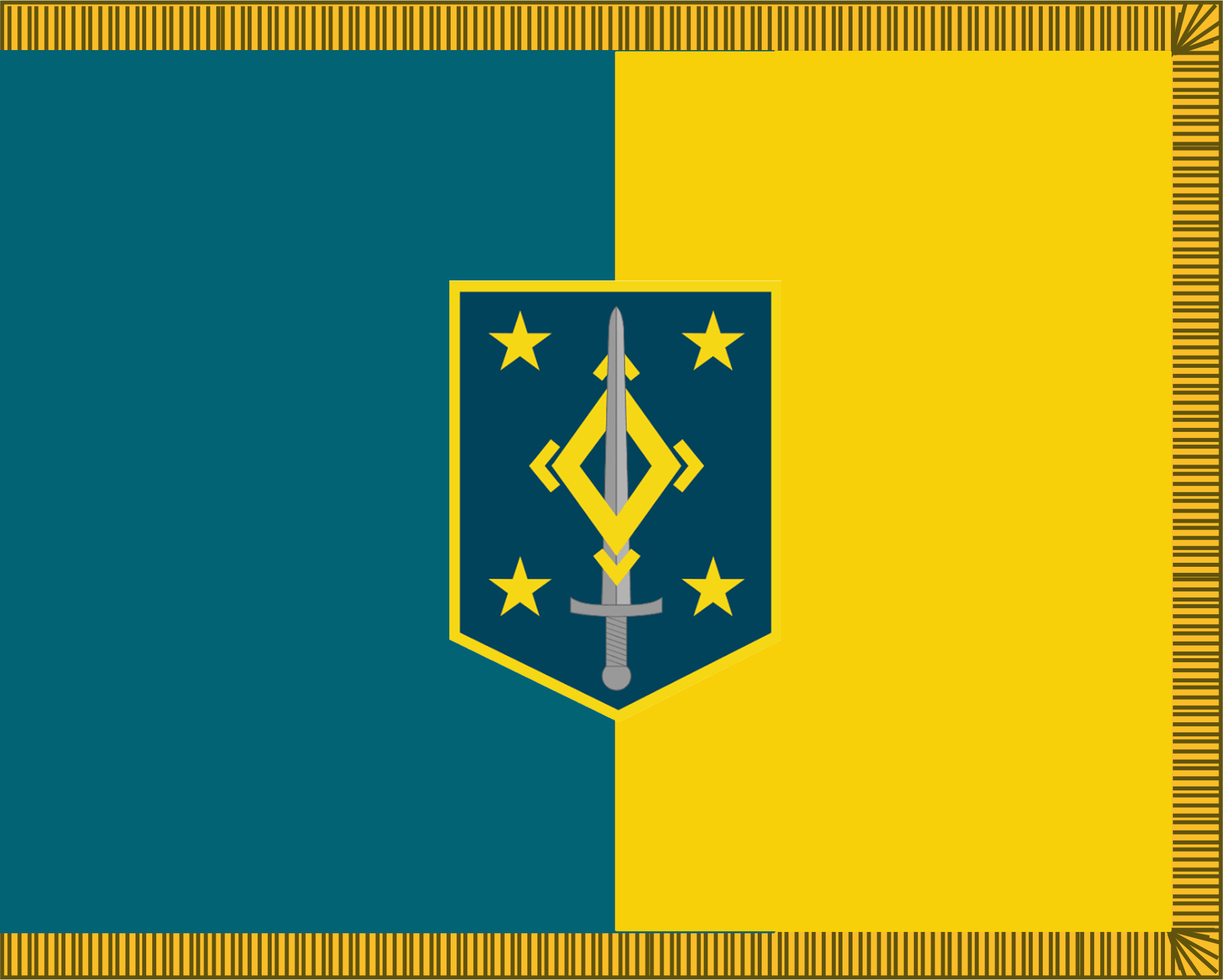
- 4th Maneuver Enhancement Brigade Flag

The 4th Maneuver Enhancement Brigade (4th MEB) was a United States Army brigade located at Fort Leonard Wood, Missouri, subordinate to the 1st Infantry Division since its activation on 16 October 2008. The 4th MEB was one of three active duty Maneuver Enhancement Brigades. The Brigade was tasked to improve the movement capabilities and rear area security for commanders at division level or higher. This was the only brigade in Fort Leonard Wood that is part of FORSCOM. The 4th Maneuver Enhancement Brigade inactivated on 17 June 2015.

The 4th MEB was composed of:

- Headquarters & Headquarters Company
- 5th Engineer Battalion
- 92nd Military Police Battalion
- 94th Engineer Battalion
- 193rd Brigade Support Battalion
- 94th Signal Company
