= 4th Brigade Combat Team, 1st Infantry Division =

United States Army combat formation

- 1st Infantry Division shoulder sleeve insignia
- Active: 2006 – 2015
- Country: United States
- Branch: United States Army
- Type: Infantry
- Role: Light infantry
- Garrison/HQ: Fort Riley, Kansas
- Nickname: "Dragon Brigade"
- Motto: Duty First
- Mascot: Dragon
- Engagements: Operation Iraqi Freedom

Commanders
- Commanding officer: COL Peter Minalga
- Command Sergeant Major: CSM Joseph Dallas

The 4th Brigade Combat Team, 1st Infantry Division was an Infantry Brigade Combat Team of the United States Army. Active from 2006 to 2015, the brigade served in Iraq from 2007 to 2008 and from 2009 to 2010, in Afghanistan from 2012 to 2013, and in a variety of theater security cooperation activities in Africa from 2014 to 2015. It was inactivated in 2015 as part of force reductions.

== History ==
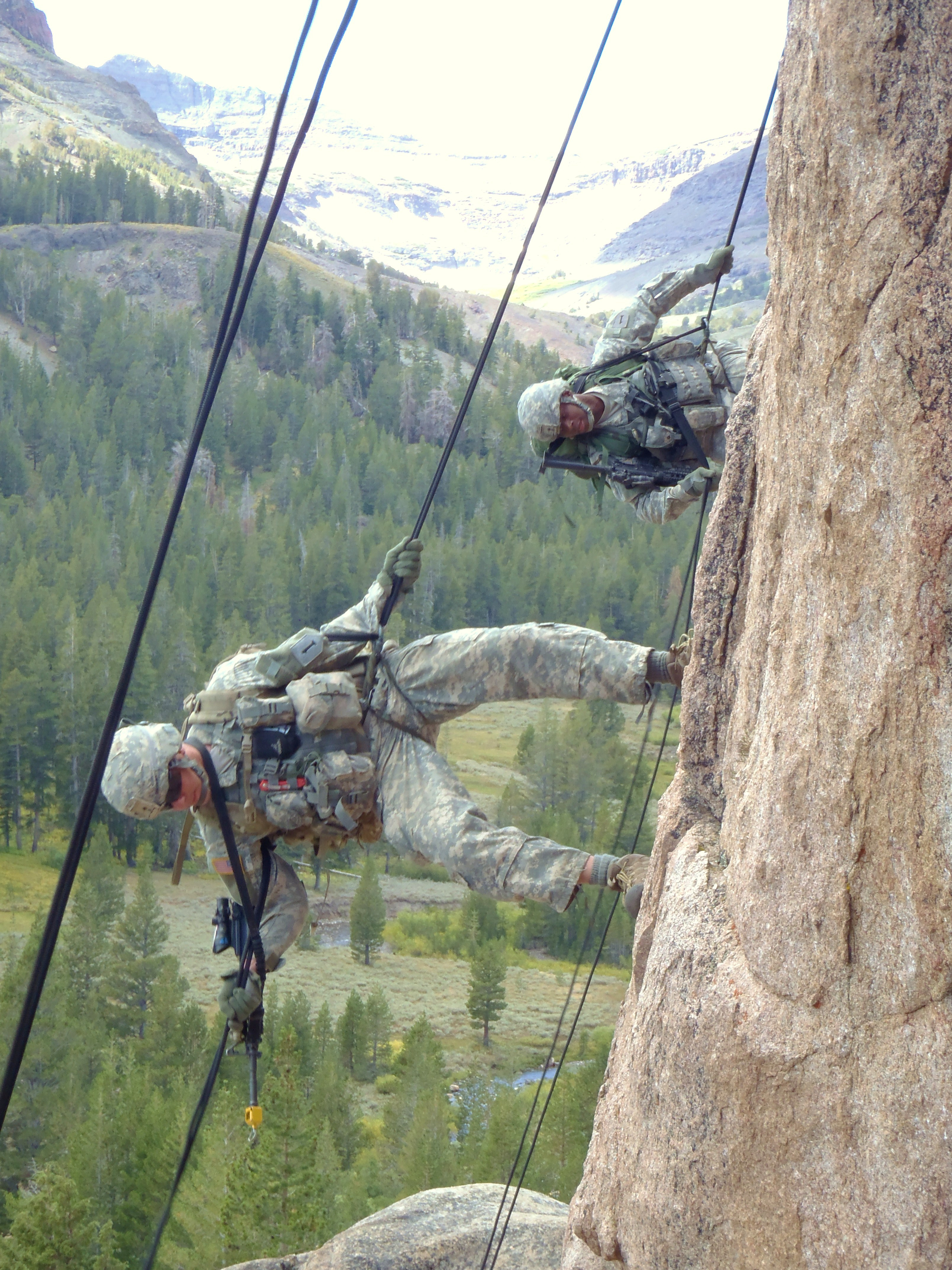
Soldiers from the 1st Battalion, 28th Infantry Regiment, 4th Infantry Brigade Combat Team, 1st Infantry Division, attend a three-week Assault Climbers training at the Marine Corps’ Mountain Warfare Training Center in Northern California, 21 September 2011.

=== Activation ===
On 12 January 2006, the 4th Brigade Combat Team held its activation ceremony. The activation was part of the transformation of the US Army to a new modular force structure. Under the new force structure, all divisions would activate a fourth maneuver brigade and otherwise reorganize their other assets. Formations representing the 2nd Battalion, 16th Infantry; 1st Battalion, 28th Infantry; 1st Squadron, 4th Cavalry; 2nd Battalion, 32nd Field Artillery; 4th Brigade Special Troops Battalion; and 701st Brigade Support Battalion, participated in the ceremony, which signified the transfer of the brigade from inactive to active status. The brigade reached combat readiness approximately 12 months after activation. When the brigade was fully functioning, 3,500 soldiers and 1,700 family members were expected to call Fort Riley, Kansas home.

=== Operation Iraqi Freedom ===
In 2007, 2nd Squadron, 4th Cavalry and the 610th Brigade Support Battalion were reflagged as the 1st Squadron, 4th Cavalry and the 701st Brigade Support Battalion respectively.

In February 2007, 4 IBCT deployed from Fort Riley to Baghdad, Iraq, as the second of five Surge brigades ordered to the Iraqi capital by President Bush. In 2010, the brigade received the Valorous Unit Award for its deployment from February 2007 to April 2008.

In August 2009, the brigade deployed again to Salah ad Din Province, Iraq, while elements of 1st Squadron, 4th Cavalry operated in Nineveh Province.

=== Operation Enduring Freedom ===
From May 2012 through February 2013, the brigade deployed to Afghanistan in support of Operation Enduring Freedom, operating from Forward Operating Base Sharana in Paktika Province under Regional Command–East. As Task Force Dragon, the brigade was responsible for security operations across Paktika Province, conducting combat patrols, route security, and counterinsurgency operations while partnering with Afghan National Security Forces.

The brigade supported the transition to Afghan-led security by advising and assisting Afghan Army and Police units, while maintaining presence across multiple forward operating bases and combat outposts. Units conducted mission planning and patrol operations from FOB Sharana and surrounding positions to disrupt insurgent activity and secure key terrain and population centers.

In parallel with combat operations, the brigade played a central role in retrograde and drawdown efforts, reducing equipment and transferring materiel and facilities to Afghan control in preparation for the eventual closure or handover of bases in Paktika and Ghazni provinces.

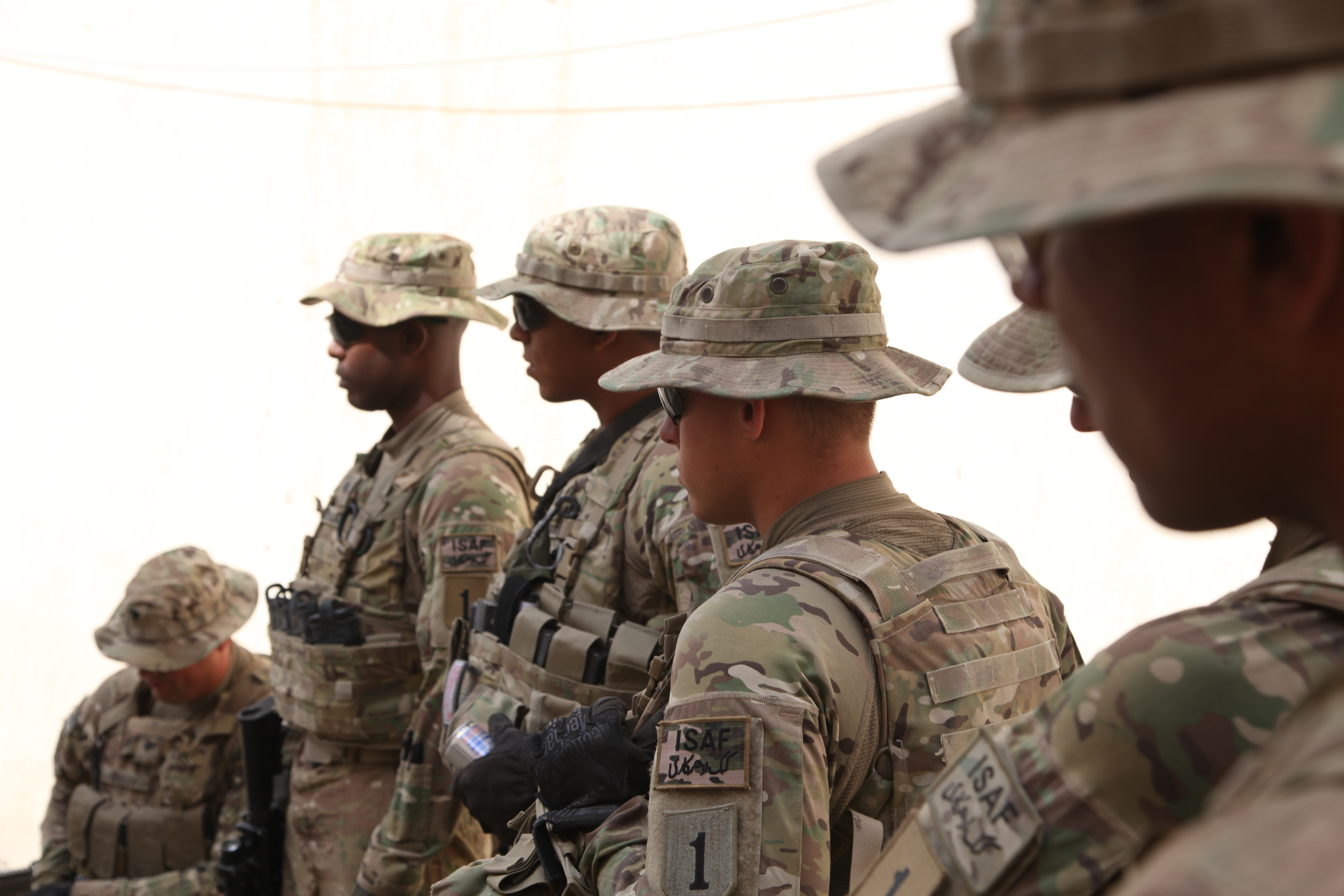
Soldiers of the 4th Infantry Brigade Combat Team, 1st Infantry Division prepare for a mission in Afghanistan

=== Inactivation ===
On 25 June 2013, Army Chief of Staff General Raymond T. Odierno announced that the 4th Brigade Combat Team, 1st Infantry Division, would be inactivated as part of a broader force reduction plan to decrease the Army’s end strength following operations in Iraq and Afghanistan.

The brigade was formally inactivated in 2015 at Fort Riley, Kansas, with subordinate units either inactivated or reassigned to other formations within the Army. As of 2026, the 4th Brigade Combat Team remains inactive and has not been reactivated.

Elements of the brigade were redistributed following inactivation. The 1st Squadron, 4th Cavalry Regiment was reactivated within the 1st Brigade Combat Team, 1st Infantry Division, while other units were inactivated or reassigned; the 2nd Battalion, 16th Infantry Regiment was not reactivated as previously projected.
