= French Division 4 =

French Division 4 may refer to:

- Championnat National 1 (1993–present), current fourth tier of the French football pyramid
- French Division 4 (1978–1993), former fourth tier of the French football pyramid

== See also ==
- French Division 3 (disambiguation)
