= 4th Mechanized Brigade (Kazakhstan) =

155th Motor Rifle Division (1970–1989) 5203rd Weapons and Equipment Storage Base (1989–1993) 511th Motor Rifle Regiment (1993–1996) 4th Separate Motor Rifle Brigade (1996–2004) 4th Separate Mechanized Brigade (2004–present)
- Active: 1970–present
- Country: Soviet Union (1970–1991); Kazakhstan (1992–present)
- Branch: Soviet Army (1970–1991); Kazakh Ground Forces (1992–present)
- Type: Motorized infantry
- Garrison/HQ: Oskemen

The 4th Separate Mechanized Brigade named for Hero K. Kaysanov (Kazakh: 4-шi жеке механикаландырылған бригадасы (4-ші жмехбр), romanized: 4-şi jeke mehanikalandyrylğan brigadasy (4-şı jmehbr); Military Unit Number 27943) is a motorized infantry brigade of the Kazakh Ground Forces. It is currently based in Novo-Akhmirovo, a suburb of Oskemen. It is part of Kazakh Regional Command East. The brigade traces its origins back to the Soviet 155th Motor Rifle Division, formed in 1970 in Semipalatinsk. The 155th became the 5203rd Weapons and Equipment Storage Base in 1989. In 1993, the 5203rd Weapons and Equipment Storage Base became the 511th Motor Rifle Regiment. In 1996, it became the 4th Separate Motor Rifle Brigade. In 2004, it was renamed the 4th Mechanized Brigade.

== History ==
In April 1970, the 155th Motor Rifle Division was activated in Semipalatinsk, subordinated to the 1st Army Corps. On 24 September 1981, it became part of the 32nd Army. In 1984, elements of the division were used to activate the 71st Motor Rifle Division. The division was relocated to Ust-Kamenogorsk (now Oskemen) in the same year. During the Cold War, the division was maintained at 64% strength. It became part of the 1st Army Corps again on 1 March 1988. On 1 October 1989, it became the 5203rd Weapons and Equipment Storage Base. The base became part of the 40th Army on 4 June 1991. In March 1992, it was taken over by Kazakhstan.

The equipment of the storage base was used to form a motor rifle regiment of the Kazakh Ground Forces on 26 April 1993 based in the village of Kalbatau, Zharma district. On 1 December 1998, the regiment was reorganized as the 4th Separate Motor Rifle Brigade. In accordance with a directive dated 28 November 2004, the brigade was redesignated as the 4th Separate Mechanized Brigade. It relocated to Novo-Akhmirovo in late 2004. The brigade is named for People's Hero of Kazakhstan Qasim Qaysenov. The 4th Separate Mechanized Brigade participated in Exercise "Tsentr-2008" with Russian troops.
