= 4th Cavalry Corps (Russian Empire) =

- Active: 1815; 1915-1917
- Country: Russian Empire
- Allegiance: Imperial Russian Army
- Engagements: World War I

The 4th Cavalry Corps was a cavalry corps in the Imperial Russian Army.

== Part of ==
- 4th Army: 1915
- 8th Army: 1915–1916
- 8th Army: 1916
- 3rd Army: 1917
- Russian Special Army: 1917

== Commanders ==
- Lieutenant General J. F. von Gillenschmidt: 1915
