= 2nd Royal Cheshire Militia =

Coordinates: 53.25357°N 2.136883°W

2nd Royal Cheshire Militia 4th (Militia) Battalion, Cheshire Regiment
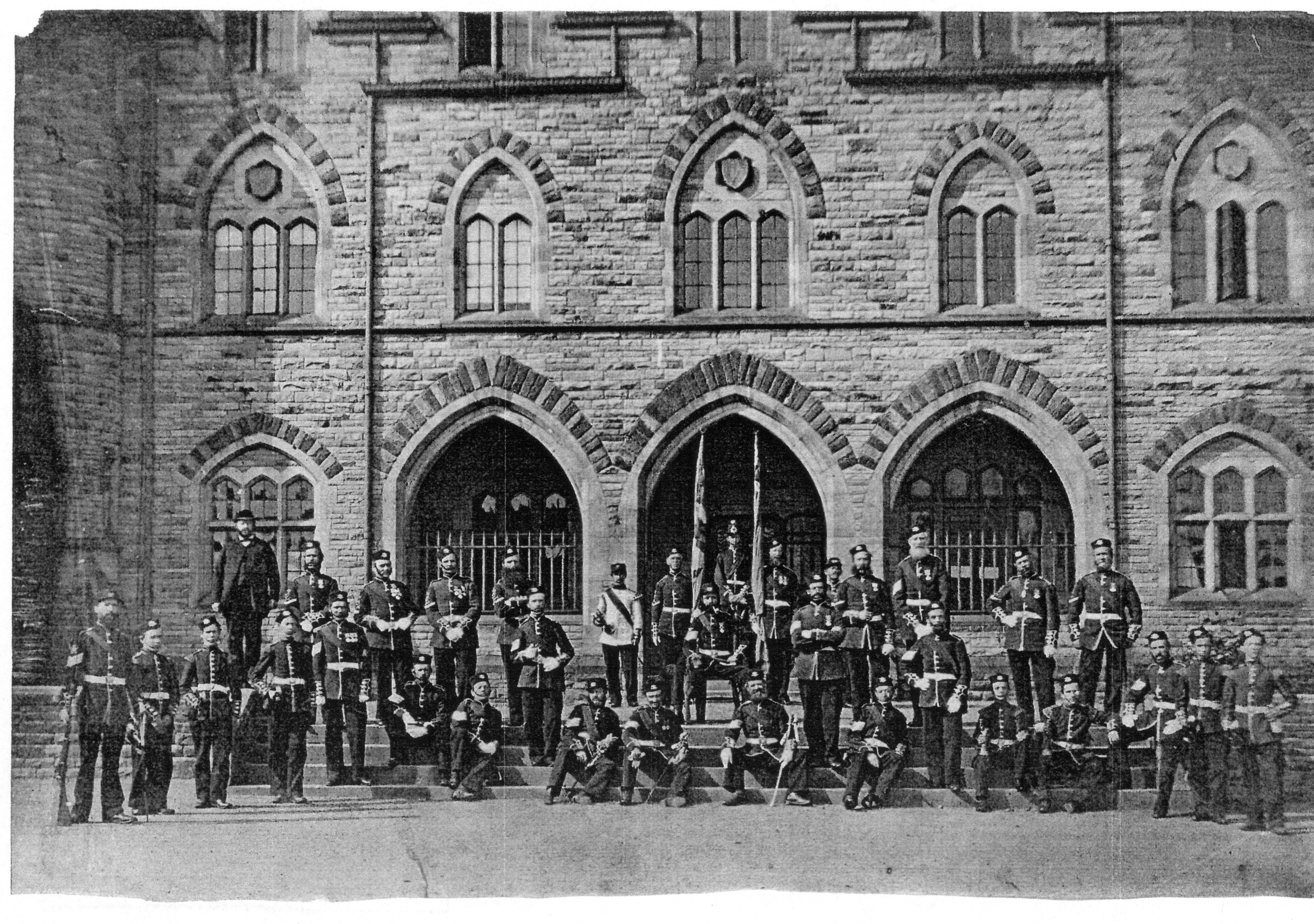
- Band of the 2nd Royal Cheshire Militia outside their barracks in Macclesfield, c1860
- Active: 1853–1908
- Country: United Kingdom (1801–1908)
- Branch: British Army
- Type: Infantry
- Garrison/HQ: Macclesfield
- Engagements: Second Anglo-Boer War

The 2nd Royal Cheshire Militia was a militia infantry battalion raised in Macclesfield, Cheshire, England in 1853. Later linked to the regular Cheshire Regiment as its 4th (Militia) Battalion, the unit served in the Second Anglo-Boer War before disbandment in 1908.

== History ==
The regiment was originally raised in Macclesfield on 25 July 1853 to provide additional Army strength during the Crimean War. On 1 July 1881 it was renamed 4th (Militia) Battalion, Cheshire Regiment, as part of the reorganisation of the militia made during the Childers reforms.

The battalion was embodied on 22 January 1900 for service during the Second Boer War in South Africa. 650 officers and men left Queenstown in the SS Orotava the following month for Cape Town. Subsequently, awarded battle honour South Africa 1900–'02. Most of the battalion, 15 officers and 420 men, left Cape Town in April 1902 and arrived at Southampton the following month.

As part of the Haldane Reforms in 1908, the battalion was disbanded on 31 July in that year.

== Commanding officers ==
The first commanding officer was Lieutenant-Colonel William Davenport Davenport, appointed 5 April 1853. Following Davenport's death, he was succeeded by George Cornwall Legh MP on 20 March 1869. On Legh's resignation Henry Brougham Loch was appointed lieutenant-colonel on 16 July 1873. In June 1884 Loch, by now knighted and governor of Victoria, Australia, retired and was made honorary colonel of the battalion. Cephas John Howard was promoted to lieutenant-colonel and commanding officer of the battalion in his place. Howard resigned his commission in March 1888. He was succeeded by Lieutenant-Colonel Robert Warren-Swettenham. In February 1900 he was succeeded by Lieutenant-Colonel Charles Harrop Beck of Upton Priory, who commanded the unit during the Boer War and was made a Companion of the Bath in September 1901. Beck resigned his commission in August 1903. The final commanding officer was Lieutenant-Colonel Henry M Nicholls, who was transferred to the unattached list when the battalion was disbanded in 1908.

== Bibliography ==
- Beckett, Ian F W (2011). Britain's Part Time Soldiers. The Amateur Military Tradition 1558–1945 (2 ed.). Barnsley: Pen & Sword. ISBN 9781848843950.
- Hay, George Jackson (Colonel) (1987) [1908]. An Epitomized History of the Militia (The "Constitutional Force"). Ray Westlake Military Books. ISBN 0-9508530-7-0.
- Home, Robert (1978). Macclesfield as it was. Nelson, Lancashire: Hendon Publishing Co Ltd. ISBN 0-86067-032-5.
- "none". Macclesfield Times (Reel 31a). 6 June 1940.
