= 4th NKVD Rifle Division =

- Active: September 1943 - August 1951
- Country: Soviet Union
- Branch: NKVD
- Type: Infantry
- Engagements: Deportation of the Chechens and Ingush; Deportation of the Crimean Tatars; Guerrilla war in the Baltic states

The 4th NKVD Rifle Division was a military formation of the People's Commissariat of Internal Affairs of the USSR during World War II. The division was active in the Deportation of the Chechens, Ingush, and Crimean Tatars and fought against the Lithuanian resistance to Soviet occupation.

== History ==
The 4th Division was formed on 28 September 1943 by order of the NKVD. It was formed in the Krasnodar Territory from soldiers of the NKVD's Internal Troops Directorate in the North Caucasus Military District. The division's headquarters was established in the city of Krasnodar.

The division took part in regular army operations during several time periods, the first of which lasted from October to December 1943. During these periods, the division was responsible for protecting the rear of several fronts, namely the North Caucasian, 1st Baltic, 2nd and 3rd Belorussian Fronts. In this capacity, the division was responsible for protecting communications lines, maintaining law and order in recaptured territory, and combating enemy sabotage and reconnaissance.

=== 1944 ===
==== January–February: Deportations of the Chechens and Ingush ====
After the first period of activation, the division was sent to Chechnya. In January and February 1944, it performed service and combat missions in the region, with the main force operating around the city of Grozny and the 137th Rifle Regiment in the village of Sunzha. Beginning on 23 February, the division began taking part in the deportation of native Chechens and Ingush from the Checheno-Ingush SSR to Kazakhstan. On 20 March, on the completion of the deportation, the division was recalled to its old headquarters in Krasnodar.

==== May: Deportations of the Crimean Tatars ====
From 12 to 19 May, elements of the division (25th, 40th, and 290th Rifle Regiments) participated in the deportation of the Crimean Tatars.

=== 1944–1951: Fighting against anti-Soviet resistance in Lithuania ===
==== 1944 Summer – 1945 Spring ====
On 12 August, the division relocated to Soviet-occupied Lithuania and established a new headquarters in Vilnius. Its new mission was to liquidate elements of the Polish Home Army (AK) which were operating in Lithuania and to combat the underground Lithuanian Liberty Army. Following the end of World War II, the division remained stationed in Lithuania and continued to fight against the Lithuanian Liberty Army.

From 24 December 1944 to 7 January 1945, the 25th NKVD Rifle Regiment joined with the 136th NKVD Rifle Regiment and destroyed an AK detachment led by Bronisław Jasiński "Komar" in the area of Lake Kernavas in the Trakai District, south of Vilnius.

==== 1947 ====
On 9 April 1947, the 32nd Rifle Regiment destroyed the headquarters of the LLA's Samogitian Military District.

==== 1948 ====
On 10 August 1948, the 298th Rifle Regiment destroyed the headquarters of the LLA's Tauras MD. On 26 August 1948, the 32nd Rifle Regiment destroyed the headquarters of the Pergale cell of the LLA.

==== 1949 ====
On 13 August 1949, the 25th Rifle Regiment destroyed the headquarters of the LLA's Prisikėlimas MD.

=== 1951: Reorganization ===
On 12 August 1951, the division was reorganized in the Baltic Military District into a department of the new Ministry of State Security of the USSR.

== Organization ==
=== Order of battle ===
- 40th NKVD Rifle Regiment (until 12 August 1944)
- 137th NKVD Rifle Regiment (until 26 November 1949)
- 298th NKVD Infantry Regiment
- 290th NKVD Novorossiysk Rifle Regiment (January 1944 – 12 August 1944)
- 25th NKVD Rifle Regiment (10 April 1944 – 26 November 1949)
- 261st NKVD Rifle Regiment (from November 1944)
- 32nd NKVD Infantry Regiment (January 1946 – 26 November 1949)
- 273rd NKVD Gdansk Rifle Regiment (January 1946 – 26 November 1949)
- 353rd NKVD Rifle Regiment (from September 1946)
- Communications Company
- Driver Company
- Internal NKVD Motorized Rifle Company
- Sapper Company
- 3881st Postal Field Station

=== Commanders ===
- Major General Pavel Vetrov (10 October 1943–1946)
- Major GeneralIvan Pankin (1948–1950)
- Colonel Ivan Babintsev (1951–12 August 1951)
