= IV Airborne Brigade (Argentina) =

4th Airborne Brigade
- Brigada Aerotransportada IV; Brigada Paracaidista IV
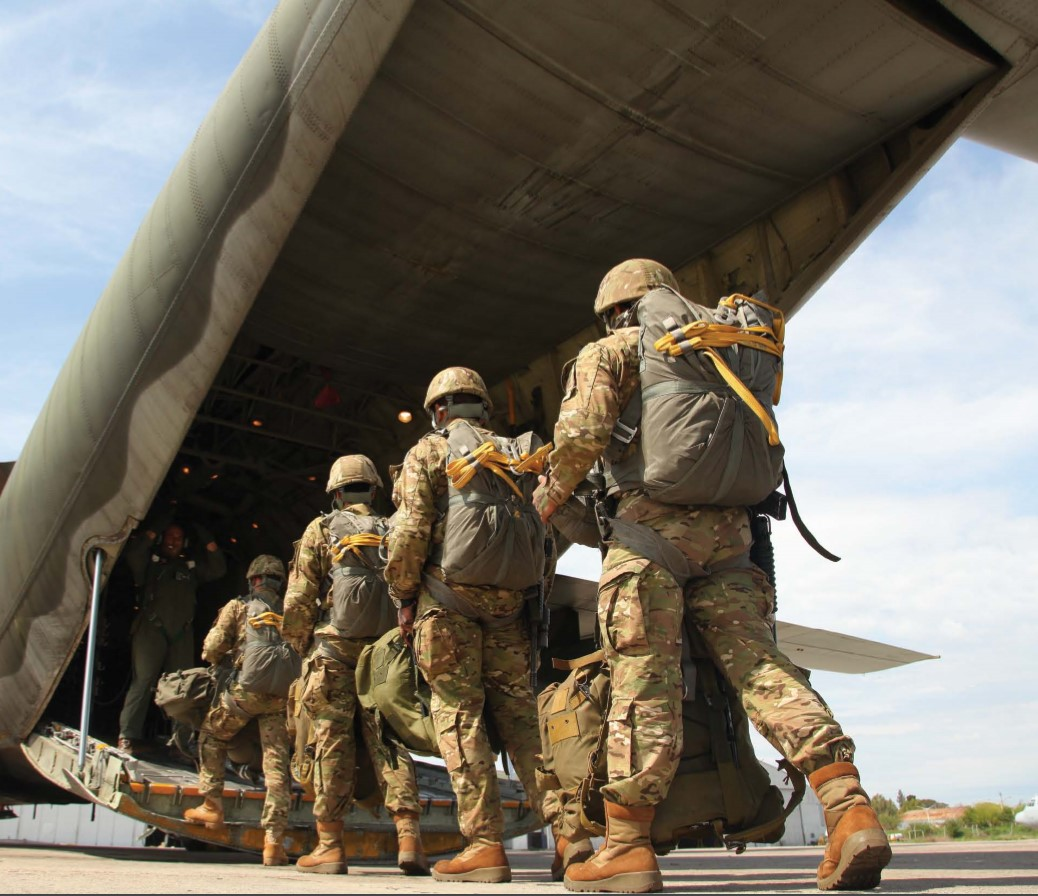
- Active: 1964–present
- Country: Argentina
- Branch: Argentine Army
- Type: Air assault infantry Airborne forces
- Size: Brigade
- Part of: Rapid Deployment Force
- Garrison/HQ: Córdoba, Argentina
- Anniversaries: 11 October – Day of the military paratrooper
- Equipment: Browning Hi-Power 9 mm FN FAL 7,62 mm FN MAG 7,62 mm
- Engagements: Cordobazo; Falklands War

Commanders
- Current commander: General Guillermo Olegario Pereda

The 4th Airborne Brigade is the only combined forces between air assault infantry and airborne forces unit of the Argentine Army (EA) that specialised in air assault and airborne operations with respond to emergency situations, combat patrols in difficult to access terrain, combined arms, counterinsurgency, CQB/CQC in urban areas, maneuver warfare, and raiding with small unit tactics. It is based in Córdoba, Córdoba Province. Together with the Ist Armoured Brigade, they make up the Rapid Deployment Force (Spanish: Fuerza de Despliegue Rápido - FDR).

== Organization ==
As of 2022 it consists of:

- IVth Airborne Brigade HQ (Córdoba)
- 2nd Paratroopers Regiment "General Balcarce" (Córdoba)
- 14th Paratroopers Regiment (Córdoba)
- 601st Air Assault Regiment (Campo de Mayo)
- 4th Paratrooper Artillery Group (Córdoba)
- 4th Paratrooper Cavalry Scout Squadron (Córdoba)
- 4th Paratrooper Engineer Company (Córdoba)
- 4th Paratrooper Signal Company (Córdoba)
- 4th Paratrooper Support Company (Córdoba)
- Logistic & Support Base "Córdoba" (Córdoba)

== Equipment ==
The members of the unit wear the red berets of the paratroopers with unit badges.

The Yarará Parachute Knife is a specially made dagger issued to Argentine paratroopers with a handguard that functions as a knuckleduster. Current issue models come with an emergency blade in the crossguard. During jumps, the knife is put in an easy-to-reach place, so it can be quickly used to cut some of the parachute cords in case of an emergency, such as the cords getting entangled.
