= 4 Squadron =

In military terms, 4 Squadron, IV Squadron or 4th Squadron may refer to:

== Aviation squadrons ==
- No. 4 Squadron RAAF, a unit of the Royal Australian Air Force
- No. 4 Squadron RCAF, a unit of the Royal Canadian Air Force
- No. 4 Squadron IAF, a unit of the Indian Air Force
- No. 4 Squadron RJAF, a unit of the Royal Jordanian Air Force
- No. 4 Squadron RNZAF, a unit of the Royal New Zealand Air Force
- No. 4 squadron PAF, a unit of the Pakistan Air Force
- No. 4 Squadron SLAF, a unit of the Sri Lanka Air Force
- No. 4 Squadron RSAF, a unit of the Royal Saudi Air Force
- 4 Squadron SAAF, a unit of the South African Air Force
- No. 4 Squadron RAF, a unit of the United Kingdom Royal Air Force
- No. 4 Squadron RNAS, a unit of the United Kingdom Royal Naval Air Service

=== United States Air Force and predecessor squadrons ===
- 4th Aero Squadron, later 4th Squadron (Observation), 4th Observation Squadron, 4th Reconnaissance Squadron, a unit of the United States Air Service
- 4th Airlift Squadron, earlier 4th Troop Carrier Squadron, 4th Air Transport Squadron, 4th Military Airlift Squadron, a unit of the Umoted States Air Force
- 4th Bombardment Squadron, a World War II unit of the United States Army Air Forces
- 4th Fighter Squadron, a unit of the United States Air Force
- 4th Reconnaissance Squadron, earlier 4th Observation Squadron, 4th Tactical Reconnaissance Squadron, 4th Expeditionary Reconnaissance Squadron, a unit of the United States Air Force
- 4th Electromagnetic Warfare Squadron, earlier 4th Surveillance Squadron, 4th Space Surveillance Squadron, 4th Space Control Squadron, a unit of the United States Air Force
- 4th Space Operations Squadron, earlier 4th Photographic Charting Squadron, 4th Photographic Mapping Squadron, 4th Reconnaissance Squadron, 4th Strategic Reconnaissance Squadron, a unit of the United States Air Force
- 4th Space Warning Squadron, earlier 4th Space Communications Squadron, a unit of the United States Air Force
- 4th Special Operations Squadron, earlier 4th Ferrying Squadron, 4th Liaison Squadron, 4th Air Commando Squadron, a unit of the United States Air Force

=== United States Navy and Marine Corps Squadrons ===
- Marine Air Control Squadron 4, a unit of the United States Marine Corps
- HSC-4 (Helicopter Sea Combat Squadron 4), a unit of the United States Navy
- VMAQ-4 (Marine Tactical Electronic Warfare Squadron 4), a unit of the United States Marine Corps
- VP-4 (Patrol Squadron 4), a unit of the United States Navy
- VQ-4 (Fleet Air Reconnaissance Squadron 4), a unit of the United States Navy
- VMU-4 (Marine Unmanned Aerial Vehicle Squadron 4), a unit of the United States Marine Corps
- VT-4 (United States) (Training Squadron 4), a unit of the United States Navy

== Naval squadrons ==
- 4th Battle Squadron, a formation of the United Kingdom Royal Navy
- 4th Destroyer Squadron, a formation of the United Kingdom Royal Navy
- 4th Submarine Squadron, a formation of the United Kingdom Royal Navy
- Submarine Squadron 4, a formation of the United States Navy

== Ground combat squadrons ==
- 2/4th Commando Squadron (Australia), a unit of the Australian Army
