= 4th Regiment =

4th Regiment may refer to:

== Australia ==
- 4th Regiment, Royal Australian Artillery
- 4th Light Horse Regiment (Australia)
- 4th Combat Engineer Regiment (Australia)

== France ==
- 4th Infantry Regiment (France)

== Greece ==
- 4th Infantry Regiment (Greece)
- 4th Archipelago Regiment
- 4/41 Evzone Regiment

== Italy ==
- 4th Army Aviation Regiment "Altair"
- 4th Mountain Artillery Regiment (Italy)

== Lithuania ==
- 4th Infantry Regiment (Lithuania)
- 4th Lithuanian Vanguard Regiment

== Philippine Commonwealth ==
- 4th Infantry Regiment (Philippine Commonwealth Army)
- 4th Infantry Regiment (Philippine Constabulary) - The military establishment of the 4th Infantry Regiment of the Philippine Constabulary was active on 1935 to 1942 and 1944 to 1946 under the U.S. military command and they stationed in Southern Luzon, Mindoro and Palawan.

== Poland ==
- 4th Regiment of Line Infantry, a unit of Kingdom of Poland created in 1815, known by its nick-name Czwartacy

== United Kingdom ==
- 4th Regiment of Foot
- 4th Regiment Royal Artillery

== United States ==
- 4th Aviation Regiment (United States)
- 4th Continental Artillery Regiment
- 4th Air Defense Artillery Regiment
- 4th Field Artillery Regiment
- 4th Regiment, New York State Artillery (redesignated as the 1st Battalion, 258th Field Artillery (United States))
- 4th Cavalry Regiment (United States)
- 4th Infantry Regiment (United States)
- 4th United States Colored Infantry Regiment
- 4th Marine Regiment (United States)
