= Airborne gun =

Airborne artillery pieces

Airborne guns are airborne artillery pieces, designed for use by paratroopers. They are generally specific or specialised types of infantry support guns, being in the traditional sense capable of being broken down into smaller loads for transport by aircraft and soldiers, thus also suitable as mountain guns. The historical concept of the "airborne guns" is to some degree outdated, their role being filled by mortars, wire-guided missiles, and/or light anti-tank weapons. As it has been many decades since two industrialized great powers engaged directly in warfare, the concept of the "airborne gun" allowing paratroopers to maintain an airhead against an armored force is in that sense non-functional, but currently, all three of the U.S. Army's howitzers (for example), are air-mobile.

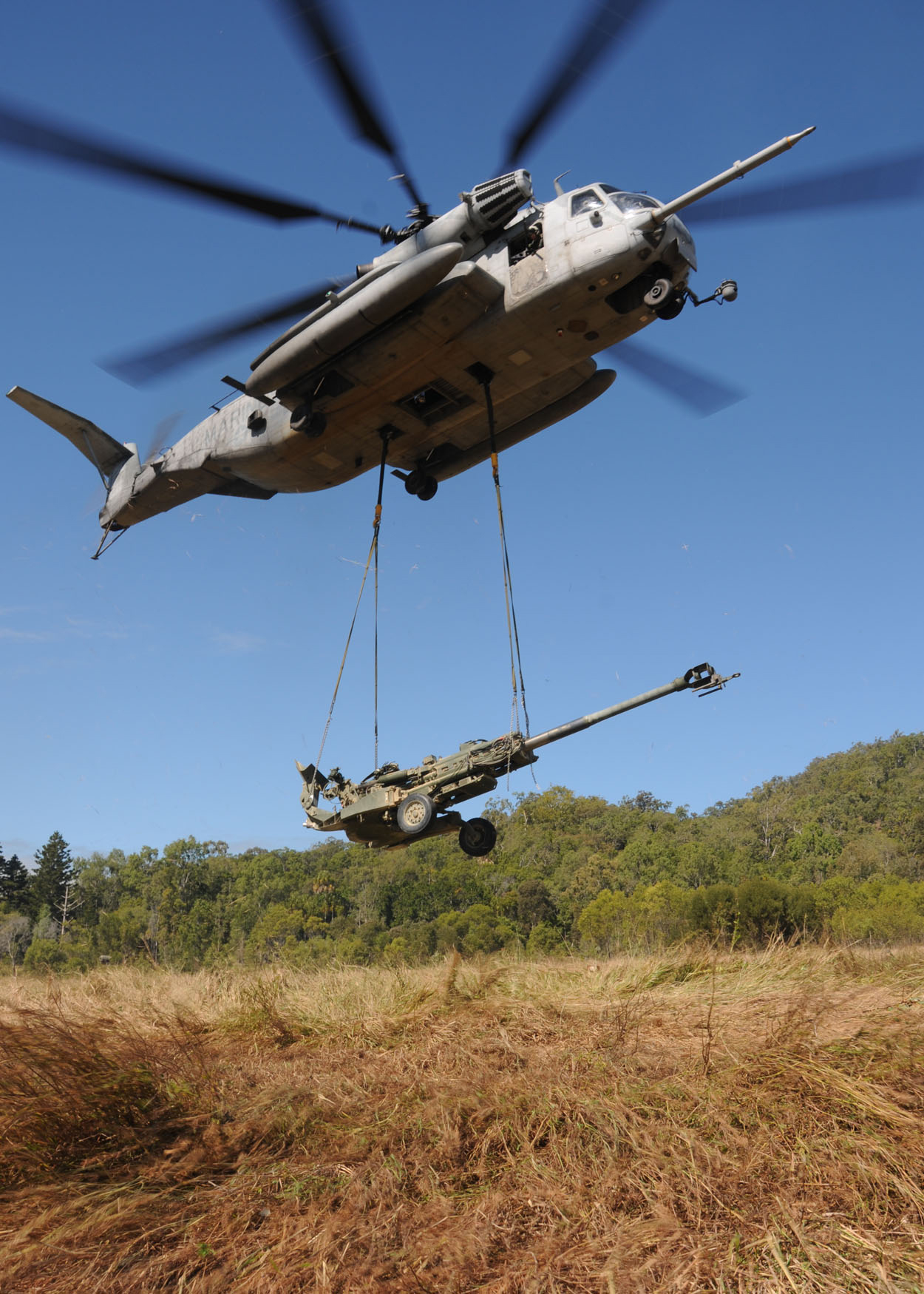
Although the concept of a purpose-built 'airborne gun' is no longer in use, modern artillery, especially if made of titanium or other lightweight materials, can be transported by air. Here is a Sea Stallion lifting an M777.

== Airborne guns by country ==
=== China ===
- Chinese airborne forces have mounted 105mm recoilless rifles on jeeps but otherwise conform to the Warsaw Pact doctrine of light armored vehicles.

=== Germany (historical) ===
- 7.5 cm leichtes Infanteriegeschütz 18

=== Italy ===
- OTO Melara Mod 56 The Mod 56 was quite popular among mountain and airborne units, as it could be broken down into 12 components.

=== Soviet Union / Russia ===
- Soviet (and Russian) military doctrine calls for its airborne forces to be fully mechanized (via the BMD series) and hence its artillery to be self-propelled. Turretless AT gun carriers like the ASU-57 and ASU-85 equipped Warsaw Pact airborne forces as well. The older 2S9 Nona and the newer 2S25 Sprut-SD heavily resemble light tanks, and are armed with a 120 mm gun-howitzer-mortar and a 125 mm autoloaded tank gun, respectively. The BM-21V (no longer in service) was a lightened variant of the BM-21 Grad MLRS. Additionally, the VDV employs a range of more traditional towed guns, namely the 2B16 Nona non-self-propelled variant, the D-30 122 mm howitzer, and the ZU-23 23 mm twin AA autocannon.

=== Turkey ===
- MKE launched the 105 mm air transportable light towed howitzer (Boran) project to fulfill the operational requests of the Commando and Infantry units for Airborne Operations. The system can calculate its own position and identify targets without usual deployment procedures thanks to its modern command and fire control systems. It has a maximum range of 17 km (11 mi) and 6400 NATO mils (360°) firing capability. The howitzer weights around 1,800 kg (4,000 lb) and can be airlifted with a medium-lift utility helicopter and deployed in a short time for fire missions.

=== United Kingdom ===
- Ordnance QF 6 pounder- antitank gun (~1960)

=== United States ===
- M119 air mobile / air assault (slingload/parachute) is based on the UK L118 Light Gun, firing a 105mm shell that is useful against light vehicles and/or fixed emplacements but would be ineffective against a main battle tank
- Bofors 40 mm L/60 gun
- The medium M198 can be dropped by parachute or transported by heavy-lift cargo helicopter, will be replaced by the even lighter titanium M777, firing 155 mm shells with significant anti-personnel capabilities. Can achieve anti-armor capability with specialised shells, e.g. SADARM

== See also ==
- Mountain gun, also known as "pack howitzer"
