= 14th Regiment Royal Artillery =

British Army artillery training regiment

14th Regiment, Royal Artillery
- Active: 1900 – Present
- Allegiance: United Kingdom
- Branch: British Army
- Role: Training
- Size: 3 Batteries; 177 permanent personnel
- Part of: Royal Regiment of Artillery
- Garrison: Larkhill, Wiltshire
- Equipment: MLRS, AS 90, Light Gun, MAMBA, ASP, HVM Stormer

14th Regiment Royal Artillery is a training regiment within the Royal Artillery, part of the British Army.

== History ==
14 Regiment Royal Artillery was formed in Woolwich in March 1900, with roots traced through the history of 28th Field Brigade, which saw action in virtually every major battle on the Western Front during the four years of World War I, and during World War II as part of the East Africa campaign. Of note, the regiment was heavily involved with 25-pounder guns in the successful Battle of Keren in Spring 1941.

Renamed '14th Field Regiment Royal Artillery' in 1947, it has also served in India, Hong Kong, Korea, Aden and later in Northern Ireland. Following disbandment in 1971, 14th Field Regiment Royal Artillery was reformed at Larkhill in December 1984 as the Training Support Regiment for the Royal School of Artillery. Initially, it was composed of 1st Battery RA "The Blazers", 132 (The Bengal Rocket Troop) Battery and 176 (Abu Klea) Battery.

== Batteries ==
The batteries are as follows:

- 1 Battery Royal Artillery — Regimental Headquarters Battery
- 24 (Irish) Battery Royal Artillery — Initial Trade Training
- 34 (Seringapatam) Battery Royal Artillery — Training Support Battery

== 1st Battery RA ==
1st Battery RA is the HQ Bty of 14 Regt RA. Its role previously was to provide the weapons troop but this was changed in January 2018.

== 24 (Irish) Battery RA ==
The Phase 2 training establishment for the Royal Artillery. It is the Battery's role to supply the Field Army with professionally trained individuals through its Trade Training in the following areas:

- Gunnery (Strike - Surface to surface)
- Communications/Signals (Gunner Command Systems)
- Driving (Car and Light Goods Vehicles)

Organisation

The Battery is currently formed with the command element made up of the Battery Commander, and the Battery Sergeant Major. Under the Battery HQ element, there are two main areas. Firstly, the 'Trade Troop', managed by a captain, troop commander, responsible for all Trade training, including driver training, for Phase 2 soldiers. Secondly there is the 'Intake Troop', also run by a captain troop commander who manages all other aspects of Phase 2 training at The Royal School of Artillery.

== 34 (Seringapatam) Battery RA ==
At present, the battery operates as the lone firing battery within 14 Regiment. It has 100 members drawn from every Regiment within the Royal Regiment of Artillery. This includes Close Support, General Support, STA, Air Defence, Parachute and Commando units, which gives the sub-unit a unique perspective and is the largest Battery in the Royal Artillery.

Equipment

- 2 × Archer
- 12 × L118 light gun

The battery has an extensive diary of varied firing commitments supporting not only the Royal Artillery, but also The Infantry Training Centre (ITC) at Warminster, the School of Army Aviation at Middle Wallop, The Royal Military Academy (RMAS) at Sandhurst, Berkshire, The Royal Military College of Science (RMCS) at Shrivenham and many others. The battery also supports RSA courses such as Young Officers (YOs), Gunnery Careers Course (GCC), Artillery Command Systems (ACS), Strike and Targeting. High-profile visits are commonplace, and the battery is unique in firing a bombard demonstration, whereby visitors are sealed in a hardened bunker and then shelled in a striking demonstration of the effects of artillery fire.
