= Zalux =

Zalux can refer to:

- Zalux, a lighting manufacturer in Spain, a subsidiary of Trilux
- a trade name of Modafinil, a medication to treat sleepiness
