= L118 light gun =

Gun, 105mm, field, L118
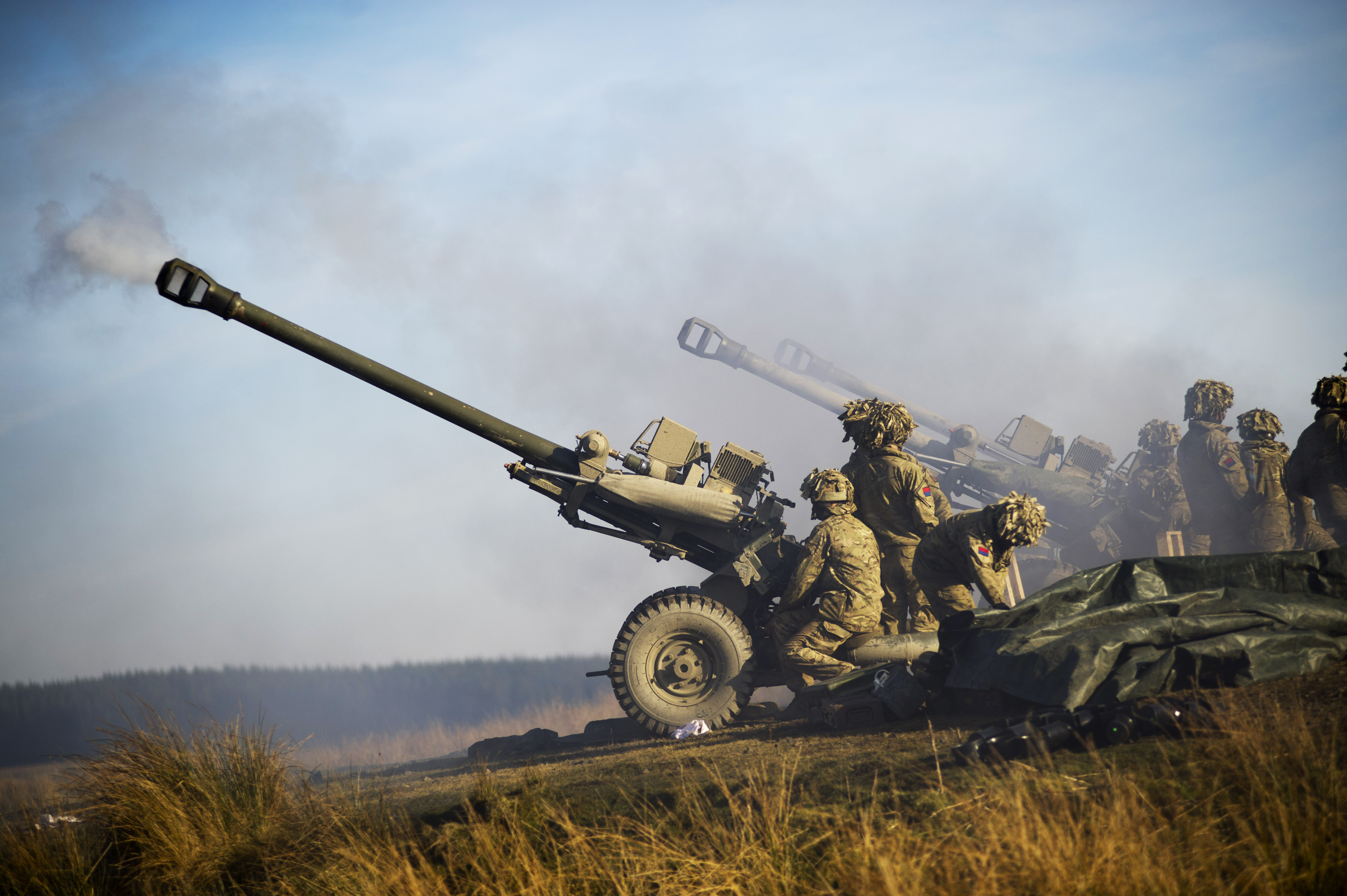
- Royal Artillery firing 105 mm light guns on exercise in 2013
- Type: Towed field gun
- Place of origin: United Kingdom

Service history
- In service: 1974–present
- Used by: See Operators
- Wars: Western Sahara War; Falklands War; Yugoslav Wars; Sierra Leone Civil War; Iraq War; War in Afghanistan (2001–2021); Russo-Ukrainian War; Russian invasion of Ukraine; 2025 Cambodia-Thailand conflict

Production history
- Designer: Royal Armament Research and Development Establishment
- Designed: 1966–1973
- Manufacturer: Royal Ordnance Factory (later BAE Systems Land and Armaments)
- Produced: 1974–2016
- No. built: Over 1,100 (Note: Number produced by 2016 including those produced under licence in Australia and the United States.)
- Variants: L119; M119

Specifications (L118)
- Mass: 1,982 kg (1.951 long tons; 2.185 short tons)
- Length: 7.01 m (23 ft) firing 4.876 m (16 ft) travelling
- Barrel length: 3.9 m (12 ft 10 in) L/37
- Width: 1.778 m (5 ft 10 in)
- Height: 1.371 m (4 ft 6 in) travelling
- Crew: 6 (minimum 3)
- Shell: Separate loading cased charge 105 x 326 mm R
- Shell weight: L31 HE (16.1 kg (35 lb)); L50 HE‐IM ER (base bleed); L42 HESH (10.49 kg (23 lb)); L43 Illuminating; L45 Smoke (15.89 kg (35 lb)); L37 Smoke, red; L38 Smoke, orange
- Calibre: 105 mm (4.1 in)
- Barrels: L19 ordnance
- Breech: Vertical sliding block
- Recoil: Hydro-pneumatic
- Carriage: L17 box trail carriage with circular firing platform
- Elevation: +1244 mils (+70 °); –98 mils (–5.5 °)
- Traverse: 200 mils (11.25 °) fine; 6400 mils (360 °) on turntable
- Rate of fire: 12 rds/min rapid 3 rds/min sustained
- Maximum firing range: 17.2 km (10.7 mi); 20.6 km (12.8 mi) base bleed
- Sights: Hall & Watts artillery sighting system; Selex ES LINAPS; Direct fire telescope
- References: Janes & BAE Systems

The L118 light gun is a 105 mm towed howitzer. It was originally designed and produced in the United Kingdom for the British Army in the 1970s. It has since been widely exported. The L119 and the United States Army's M119 are variants that use a different type of ammunition.

The L118 uses separate-loading cased-charge ammunition – the projectile is loaded into the gun and rammed by hand, then the cartridge with propellant is loaded behind it. The L119 and M119 use "semi-fixed" ammunition – when it is prepared for firing, the projectile is fitted into the top of the cartridge case and the shell loaded into the gun as a complete round.

== History ==
=== Development ===
From 1961 to 1975, the British Army used the 105 mm pack howitzer L5 with L10 ordnance (OTO Melara Mod 56) as its light artillery weapon, replacing the 75 mm howitzer, 4.2 inch mortar, and 25-pounder gun in eight regular artillery regiments. It fires the US M1 type ammunition (called "105 mm How" in the UK). The Mod 56 was originally designed in Italy for its mountain artillery units. It was light enough to be lifted by Westland Wessex helicopters or towed by Land Rovers. It could also be dismantled, with no piece heavier than 128 kg (282 lb) to be transported by mules or horses. It lacked range (making it potentially vulnerable to counter-battery fire), was not notably robust, and had poor sights. Nor were its rate of fire and time to prepare for opening fire satisfactory.

In 1965, a general staff requirement was approved for a new 105 mm weapon system because the L5 pack howitzer "lacked range and lethality". Key characteristics included 6400 mil (360°) traverse by one soldier, maximum weight of 3,500 pounds (1,600 kg), small enough size to be carried inside new Chinook helicopters and Andover transport aircraft, and ability to fire immediately after being under water for 30 minutes. The ammunition to be used was the 105 mm Fd Mk 2 ammunition used in the L13 ordnance of the gun equipment 105 mm L109 (better known as the "Abbot self-propelled gun"). This ammunition uses electrical instead of percussion primers and is an entirely different design from the US M1 type ammunition as used in the L5 pack howitzer. The two types are not interchangeable. An early requirement was for the new weapon to use 105 mm Fd Mk 1 ammunition, which uses the M1 shell, in training. However, in 1968, this was changed to allow a different version of the weapon, which subsequently became the L119, to fire US 1935 pattern (i.e. M1) ammunition.

The new gun, soon designated "light gun", was designed by the government Royal Armament Research and Development Establishment (RARDE), Fort Halstead, Kent. Prototypes were tested in 1968. It soon emerged that some increase in weight was needed for the requisite robustness, and several assemblies were substantially redesigned.

Original production, which was authorised in late 1975, was by Royal Ordnance Factory, ROF Nottingham, which has since been incorporated into BAE Systems Land and Armaments. Deliveries started in 1976.

=== In British service ===
The light gun entered service with the British Army in 1976. It was heavier than its predecessor, but helicopters that could carry it, such as the Puma and Westland Sea King, were entering service at the same time. A new vehicle, the Land Rover 101 Forward Control ("Land Rover, one-ton"), was designed as its prime mover in the field (and also for the Rapier air-defence missile launcher). Since the end of the 1990s, the British Army has used Pinzgauer ATVs as their gun tractors. In Arctic service, and elsewhere, the gun is towed by the Hägglunds Bv 206 and is fitted with skis when over snow.

In 1982, five batteries (30 guns) were deployed to the Falkland Islands during the Falklands War. In the final phases of the battles around Port Stanley, these guns were firing up to 400 rounds per gun a day, mostly at "charge super", the most powerful propellant charge for which they were designed.

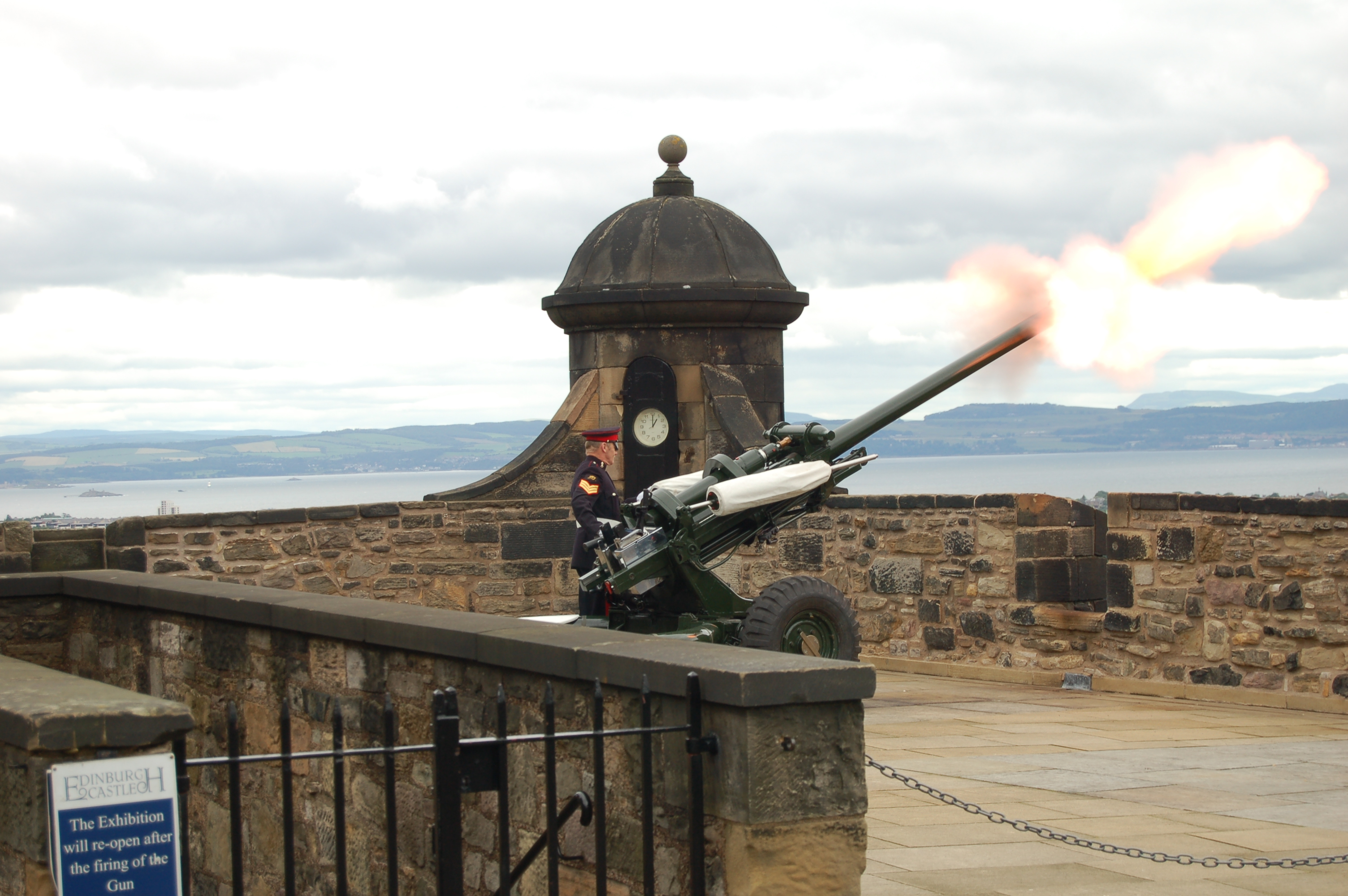
The One O'Clock Gun firing at Edinburgh Castle

At present, the British Army has four light gun regiments: 3rd Regiment Royal Horse Artillery, 4th Regiment Royal Artillery, 7th (Parachute) Regiment Royal Horse Artillery, and 29 Commando Regiment Royal Artillery. Other regiments were temporarily equipped with it for service in Afghanistan. The 14 (Training) Regiment Royal Artillery uses it for training at the Royal School of Artillery.

Four regiments of the Army Reserve, The Honourable Artillery Company (HAC), 103rd (Lancashire Artillery Volunteers) Regiment Royal Artillery, 104th Regiment Royal Artillery and 105th Regiment Royal Artillery) are also equipped with the light gun. Those University Officer Training Corps with "gun troops" train with the L118.

On 30 November 2001, an L118 light gun replaced a 25-pounder gun as the One O'Clock Gun in Edinburgh Castle. By tradition, this fires at one o'clock every afternoon, except on Sundays, Good Friday and Christmas Day. The light gun is also fired by 14 (Training) Regiment Royal Artillery on Remembrance Sunday and Armistice Day each year.

As of July 2017, there were 126 L118 light guns in service with the British Army.

== Design ==
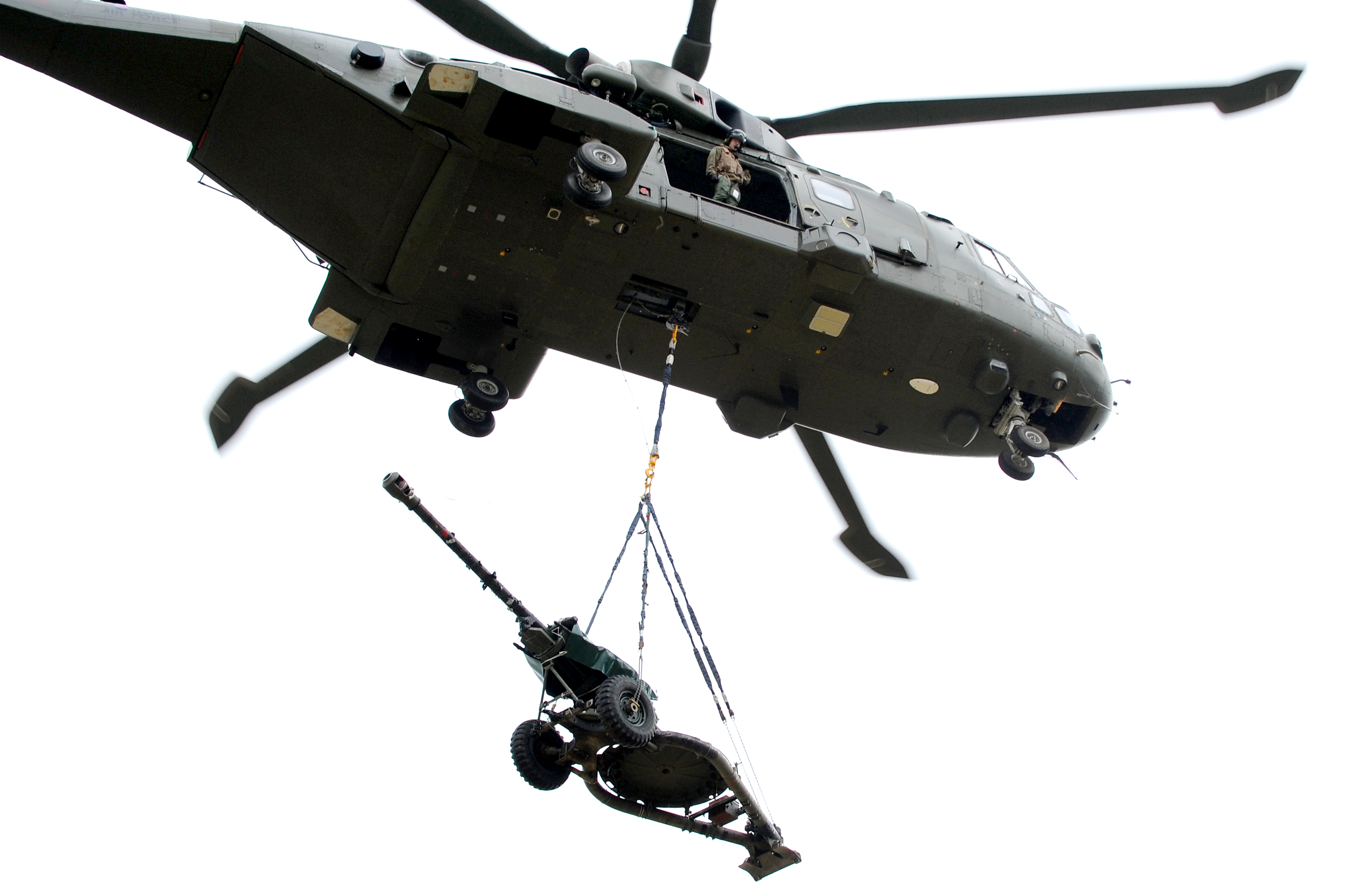
A L118 slung from a RAF Merlin at RAF Benson

The L118 uses the L19 ordnance on the L17 carriage. The L19 ordnance is slightly shorter than the L13 used by the Abbot and hence has a slightly shorter maximum range. Also, unlike the Abbot, the barrel is autofrettaged and hence lighter.

The light gun appears to owe a number of its features to the 25-pounder gun, unsurprisingly since RARDE was the successor to the design department, Woolwich Arsenal. Among these features are its vertically sliding block breech, and a box trail instead of a split trail; a traversing platform is normally used with it. Its comparatively light weight is also attributed to the nature of the steel used in the carriage and ordnance, and other weight-reducing features, including its narrow wheelbase.

The narrow wheelbase prevents the ordnance rotating the 3200 mil (180°) required to 'unfold' the gun. Because of this, the gun features a knock-off hub on one side, allowing the ordnance to be rotated by removing one wheel. With a well-trained gun crew, this contributes approximately 30 seconds to the time required to deploy the gun. In British service, rotating the barrel for towing is optional.

When being towed in the unfolded position, the A-frame is fitted to the front transom in order to support the elevating mass. A recent modification makes it possible to keep the gun in this position indefinitely at speeds up to 40 mph (64 km/h). For long-distance transport or traversing rough terrain, the barrel is reversed and clamped to the end of the trail. For storage, the gun is in the unfolded position with the barrel elevated to an angle that balances the elevated mass on the yoke and therefore relieves pressure on the elevating gears.

When first introduced in the British Royal Artillery, the L7 or L7A1 dial sight and its carrier, incorporating an integral elevation scale and internal lighting powered by Trilux nuclear light sources, was used to aim the gun for indirect fire. The L7 sight is a modified version of a German Leitz instrument. Since the light gun entered service after the introduction of field artillery computer equipment (FACE), it never, unlike the Abbot, had gun rules (large slide rule like instruments used at each gun to convert range in metres to tangent elevation in mils, taking account of muzzle velocity). Therefore, it has a single quadrant elevation scale. These optical indirect fire sights are now only used in recruit training.

The guns also have a direct-fire telescope and were originally issued with a night telescope using image intensification.

=== Ammunition ===
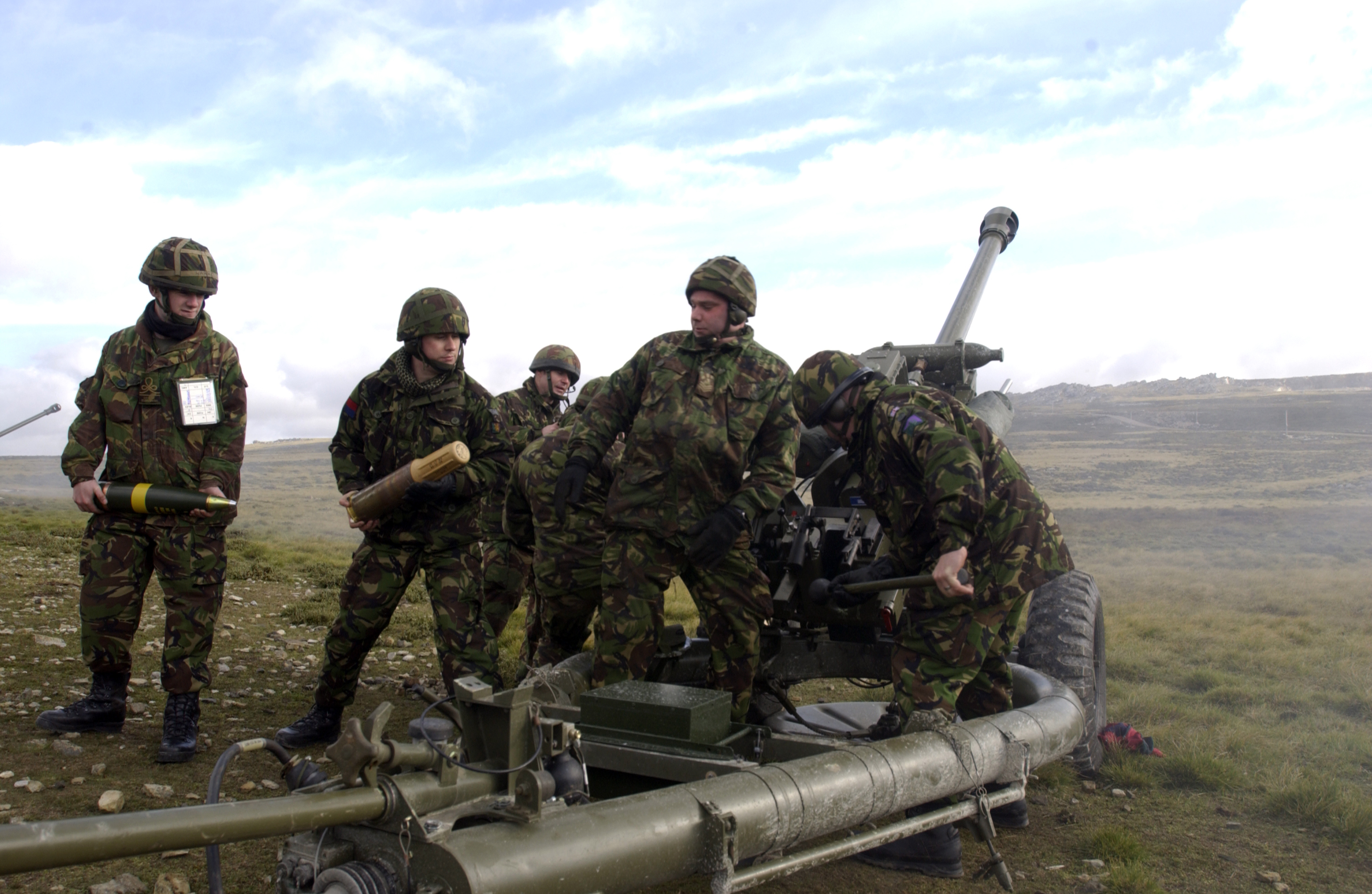
Gunners with a shell and a propellant cartridge ready to load

The 105 mm Fd Mk 2 ammunition has two propelling cartridges and a blank cartridge (for saluting purposes). The normal cartridge has six propellant increments (charges 1, 2, 3, 4, 4½, and 5). Charge 4½, which is charge 5 with the blue charge three bag removed, is peculiar to the light gun and is used only for high-angle fire. A separate "charge super" cartridge is used for firing to maximum range.

Both charge five and charge super project beyond the end of the metal cartridge case. The 105 mm Fd is "separate, cased"; the shell is loaded and rammed by hand, then the cartridge with propellant is loaded. By the time the L118 entered service, propellant sub-zones A and B originally used with the Abbot had been replaced by an aerodynamic spoiler (a ring slipped over the nose of shell to lodge on the ogive) to reduce the minimum range at high-angle fire when this was required.

The 105 mm Fd Mk 2 rounds were the same as used with Abbot when the L118 was first introduced. The ammunition types originally or subsequently in UK service include:

- L31 HE (high explosive) series is a series of 105 mm rounds which are claimed to have a 25% greater lethal area than the US 105 mm M1 HE shells.
  - L31A1 HE round is made from forged or cold‐extruded high‐tensile steel with a single copper band and a nominal fuzed weight of 16.103 kg (35.50 lb). The L31A1 has two main fillings both weighing 2.431 kg (5.36 lb), Type A is 60:40 RDX/TNT, Type B is 55:45 RDX/TNT. Fuzes used are the L32 and L85A2 point detonating, the L33 mechanical time or the L27 variable time.
  - L31A2 HE has a nominal fuzed weight of 15.984 kg (35.24 lb) and its main filling is 2.3123 kg (5.098 lb) of creamed TNT. Fuzing is as with the L31A1.
  - L31A3 HE has a nominal fuzed weight of 16.089 kg (35.47 lb) and its main filling is 2.3123 kg (5.098 lb) of Bridgewater produced Type A 60:40 RDX/TNT and topped with TNT. Fuzing is as with the L31A1 with the addition of the L116 multi‐option fuze.
  - L31A4 HE is available in two versions, conventional explosive and insensitive munition (IM)-compliant. The conventional explosive shell's main filling is a Eurenco RDX/TNT. The IM-compliant shell was originally designated the L50A2, its explosive filling is 2.9 kg (6.4 lb) of ROWANEX 1100. (Note: ROWANEX 1100 is an insensitive cast‐cued plastic bonded explosive based on RDX and HTPB.) Fuzing is either the L106A4 point detonating or the L116A1 multi-purpose fuze.
- L45 smoke base ejection. This contains three canisters filled with hexachloroethane, which are ejected from the base of the shell in flight by a mechanical (L92) or electronic time fuze (L132 being replaced by L163). On falling to the ground, they generate dense white smoke for 60 seconds.
- Target marker. These generate dense orange (L38) or red (L37) cloud (produced by a mixture of PETN HE and coloured dye) bursting in the air or on impact, and are used to designate targets, e.g. for air strikes.
- L43 illuminating. Provides a parachute flare base ejected by time fuze (L81) at about 400 m (1,300 ft) above the ground and burns for 30 seconds.
- L42 high explosive squash head. Used for direct fire against armoured targets or buildings, has a base fuze with tracer.
- L41 PRAC. Inert practice shell used in training instead of HESH.
- L50A2 HE‐IM ER (high explosive, insensitive munition, extended range) features a base bleed unit, extending the range of the projectile to 20.6 km (12.8 mi). The round's explosive fill is 2.5 kg (5.5 lb) of ROWANEX 1100. Fusing is as with the L31A4.
- L53 HE‐IM (high explosive, insensitive munition) is intended to gradually replace the L31A4 round, retaining the external ballistics of the L31 series but with a shell body optimised for fragmentation. The round has a ROWANEX explosive fill. Fusing is as with the L31A4.
- L54 "black light" illumination, using the same configuration as L43, to assist observation through night viewing devices.
- L83 drill. An inert shell for non-firing training purposes.

A white phosphorus smoke shell has never been adopted by the UK for L118. A base bleed insensitive HE shell, with a maximum range of 20.6 kilometres (12.8 mi) has been developed.

=== Subsequent enhancements ===
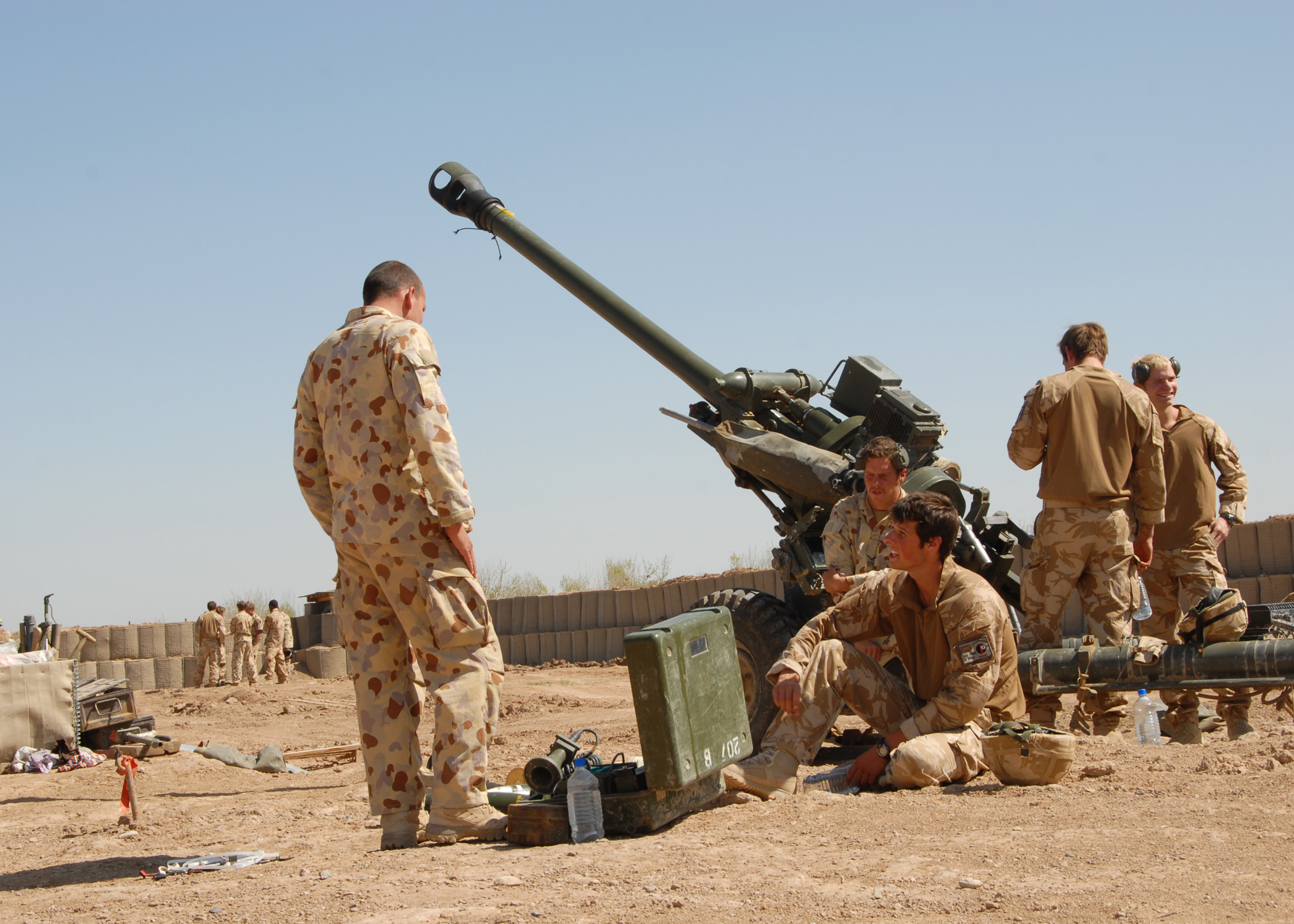
Australian and British gunners with L118 in Afghanistan, 2009

During the early 1990s all UK L118 were fitted with a muzzle velocity measuring device (MVMD), a radar, and its power supply.

In 2002, the British Army's L118 guns completed replacement of their optical sights with the LINAPS artillery pointing system (APS) mounted above the barrel. This is a self-contained system that uses three ring laser gyros to determine azimuth, elevation angle and trunnion tilt angle. It also includes facilities for navigation and self-survey using a global positioning system, inertial direction measurement and distance measurement. All this can be used anywhere in the world to lay the gun without external references. The outputs and inputs for APS are through the touchscreen layer's display and control unit (LCDU) that replaced the conventional dial sight and its mount. The LCDU enables the layer to lay the gun by moving the barrel until the LCDU displays no difference between the ordered firing data and where the barrel is pointing as determined by the LINAPS sensors.

A capability enhancement program that started delivering improvements to UK guns in 2007 aimed at reducing weight and improving some components. Weight reduction measures include the replacement of some steel components by titanium, however, only some elements entered UK service. The MVMD is also more tightly coupled with the LCDU, reducing electrical power requirements.

Around 2010, new direct fire sights for longer range use were introduced for service in Afghanistan. These comprise a sniper's telescopic sight and a new night sight.

At the end of 2011, a new LCDU with a slightly larger touchscreen was ordered. It may enable data transfer from FC-BISA and include the NATO armament ballistic kernel (NABK) for direct fire shooting.

== Variants ==
=== L119 ===
The L119 variant has a different barrel (a slightly shorter L30 ordnance with a percussion firing mechanism) for firing the ubiquitous US M1 type ammunition (UK 105 mm How), giving the gun a max range of 11,400 metres (12,500 yd). When the "semi-fixed" M1 ammunition is prepared for firing, any propellant charge bags that are not going to be used are removed from the cartridge case, then the projectile is fitted into the top of the case. The shell is then loaded into the gun as a complete round, unlike the L118 ammunition, where the projectile and cartridge case are loaded separately.

In British service, the L119 was used only for training at the Royal School of Artillery while stocks of 105 mm How lasted, and the last British L119s were retired in 2005. However, the L119 is popular with many export customers who still rely on M1 ammunition. In 2022, the New Zealand Army sent 30 soldiers to the United Kingdom to train Ukrainian soldiers on the L119 light gun, as military assistance to Ukraine. They were to be stationed in the United Kingdom from May to July, with each course to take a week. New Zealand also donated approximately 40 dial sights to Ukraine.

=== M119 ===
The L119 was further modified and produced under licence for the United States Army. The most recent version is the M119A3 introduced in 2013 with a digital fire-control system and GPS-aided inertial navigation unit using software derived from the M777A2.

=== Other variants ===
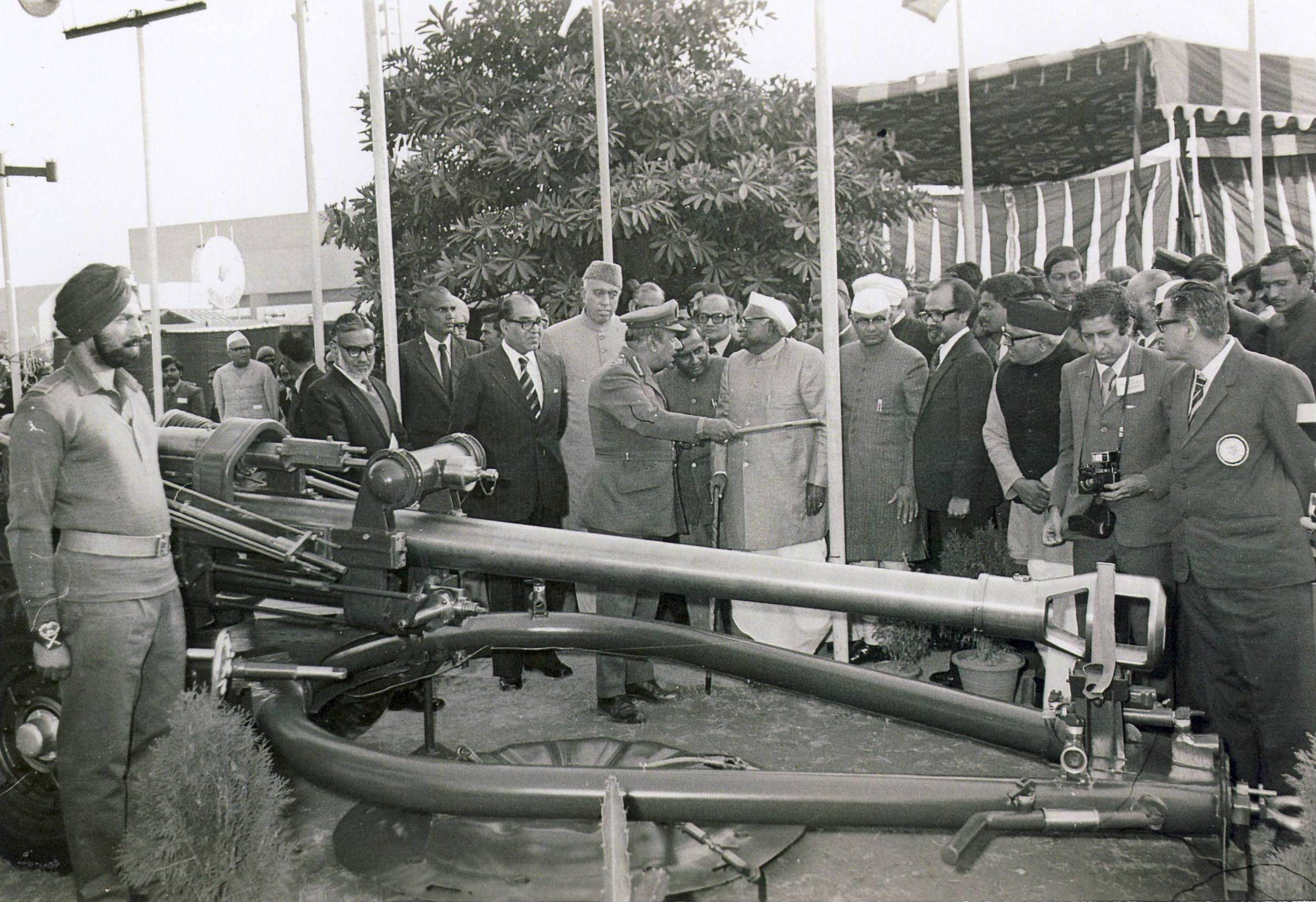
Indian light field gun on display

During the 1970s, a third variant with the L21 ordnance, was developed and prototypes produced. This was for Switzerland and used Swiss pattern 105 mm ammunition. It did not enter service.

The Indian Field Gun appears to share many features with the UK equipment. In the late 1960s India introduced the Value Engineered Abbot variant with the 105 mm Fd ammunition; this led to the 105 mm field gun (India), which appears to have some light gun features in its elevating mass, although its platform is similar to a Ordnance QF 25-pounder field gun. The 105 mm light field gun is much more like L118, although somewhat heavier.

In 1984, the L119 entered service with the Australian Army named the "Hamel gun" to replace the M2A2. The gun was manufactured under licence in Australia for the Australian and New Zealand armies using mostly Australian produced components. Plans to produce 105 mm field ammunition were postponed.

The 105 mm saluting gun: The British Army has a number of dedicated saluting guns for ceremonial purposes. Based on the standard L118, these saluting guns are modified to exclusively fire blank cartridges, are not fitted with the APS system and are easily distinguished from the field gun variant by their distinctive bronze green paintwork, chromed muzzle brake, and chromed breech.

== Operators ==
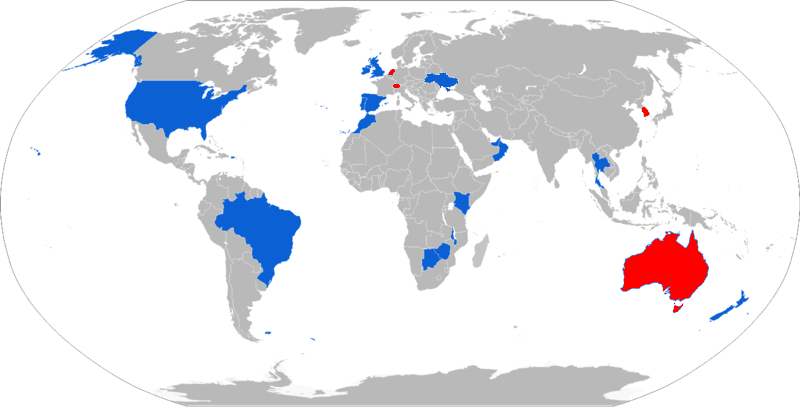
Map with L118 operators in blue and former operators in red

=== Current operators ===
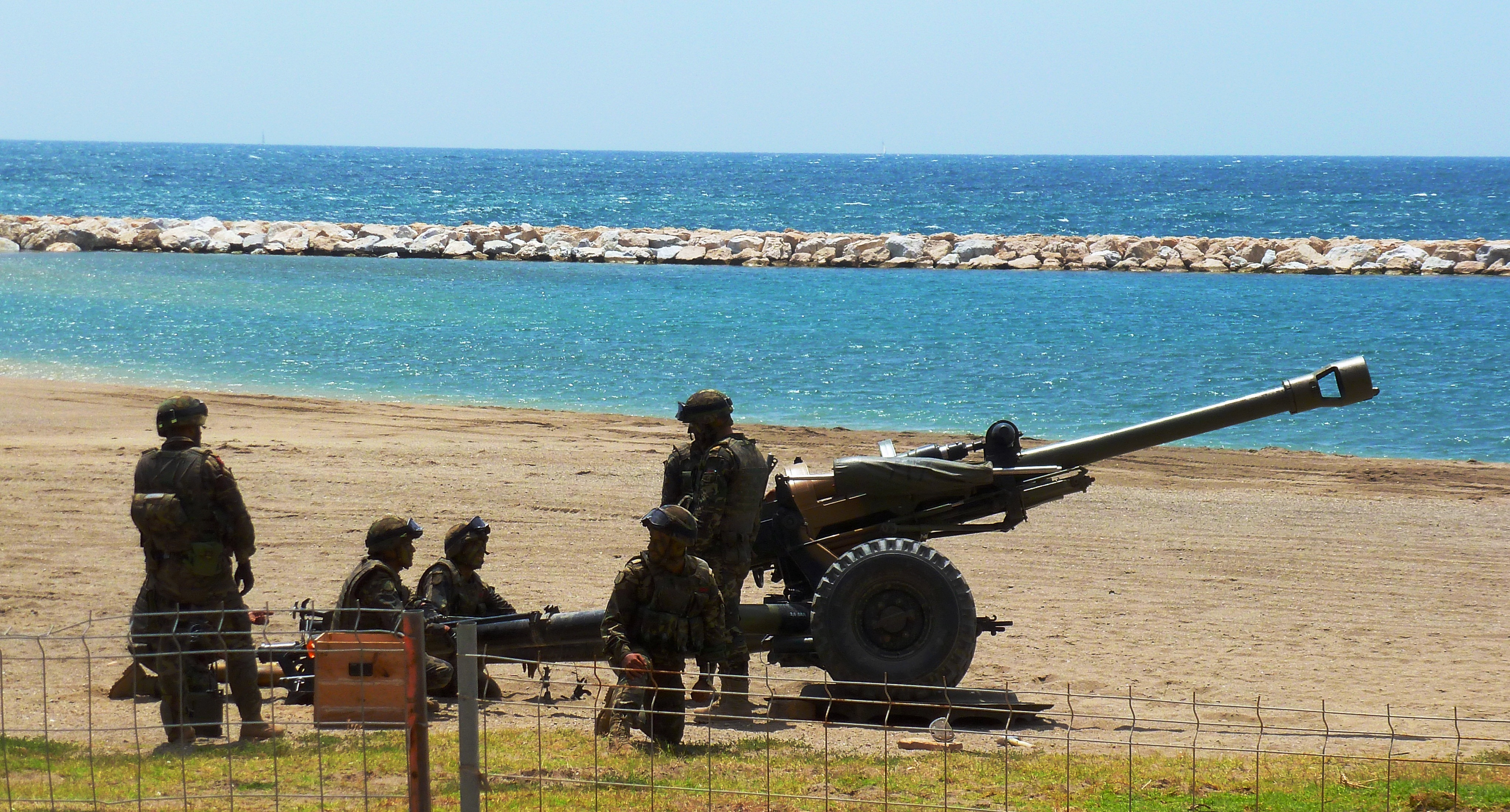
L119 gun of the Spanish Legion's Artillery Group

- Bahrain: 8 L118
- Benin: 12 L118
- Bosnia-Herzegovina: 36 L118
- Botswana: 12 L118
- Brazil: 40 L118 (Army) and 18 L118 (Marines)
- Ireland: 24 L118 and 6 L119
- Kenya: 40 L118
- Malawi: 9 L118
- Morocco: 30 L118
- Nepal: 8 L118
- New Zealand: 24 L119
- Oman: 42 L118
- Portugal: 21 L119
- Spain: 56 L118
- Thailand: 60 L119 – Royal Thai Army received a domestic production license
- United Arab Emirates: 73 L118
- United Kingdom: 126 L118 (Army)
- Ukraine: 54 L119 and 72 of unspecified variant provided by the US (16 in August 2022, 4 in September 2022, 16 in October 2022, 36 in January 2023)
- United States: 821 M119A2/A3 (72 given to Ukraine)

=== Former operators ===
- Australia (111 L119, withdrawn from service and mothballed in 2014; 92 were sold to British company BAE Systems in 2018)
- Netherlands (8 L118 on loan from the United Arab Emirates in 1995)
- South Korea (2 L118 in June 1976 for evaluation)
- Switzerland (6 L127A1 prototypes delivered 1979–1981)

== See also ==
- Airborne gun
- GIAT LG1 howitzer, France
- KH178 howitzer, South Korea
- MKE Boran howitzer
