= ASU-85 =

Soviet assault gun

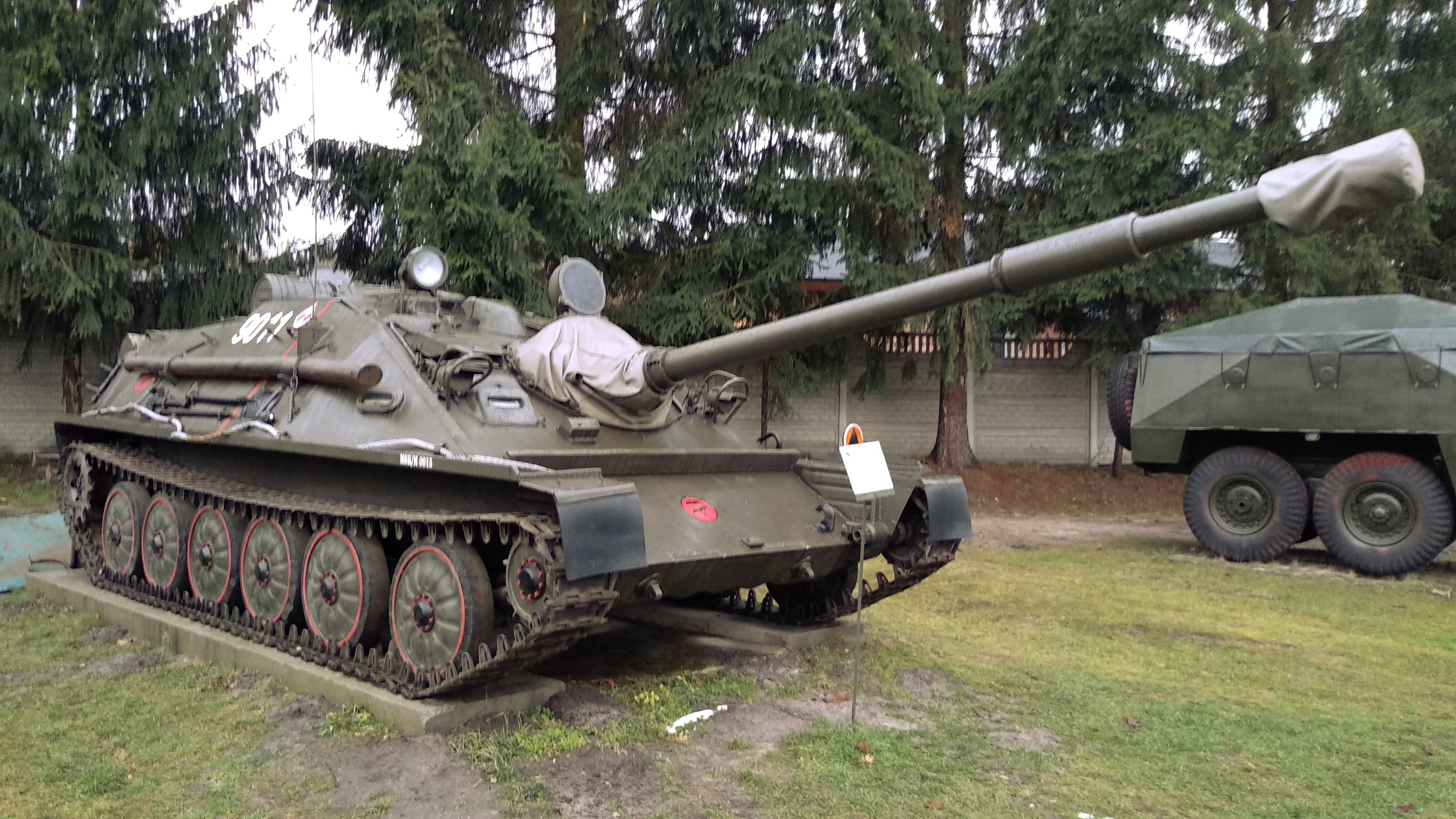
- ASU-85 at the exhibition in the Museum. White Eagle in Skarzysko-Kamienna.
- Type: Assault gun
- Place of origin: Soviet Union

Service history
- In service: 1959–1993/ 2022-
- Wars: Warsaw Pact invasion of Czechoslovakia; Soviet–Afghan War; Sino-Vietnamese War; Russo-Ukrainian War

Production history
- Designer: Astrov Design Bureau
- Designed: 1951–1959
- Manufacturer: MMZ; PMZ
- Produced: 1959–1966

Specifications
- Mass: 15.5 tonnes (34,171 lb)
- Length: 8.49 m (27 ft 10 in)
- Width: 2.80 m (9 ft 2 in)
- Height: 2.10 m (6 ft 11 in)
- Crew: 4
- Armor: 40–45 mm
- Main armament: 85 mm main gun D-70 (2A15)
- Secondary armament: 1× 7.62 mm PKT or SGMT coaxial machine gun
- Engine: YaMZ-206V 6 cylinder inline water-cooled diesel engine 210 hp (154 kW)
- Power/weight: 13.5 hp/tonne
- Transmission: mechanical
- Suspension: torsion bar
- Fuel capacity: 400 l
- Operational range: 230 km (161 mi)
- Maximum speed: 45 km/h (28 mph)

The ASU-85 (Russian: Авиадесантная самоходная установка, АСУ-85, romanized: Aviadesantnaya Samokhodnaya Ustanovka, ASU-85 – airborne self-propelled mount) is a Soviet-designed airborne self-propelled gun of the Cold War era. From 1959, it began to replace the open-topped ASU-57 in service. It was, in turn, replaced by the BMD-1 beginning in 1969.

== Development history ==
Development of a new assault gun for the armed forces started at the OKB-40 design bureau of the Mytishchi Machine Building Plant (MMZ), under the supervision of chief designer Nikolaj Aleksandrovich Astrov. The first Ob'yekt 573 prototype was ready for factory tests in the second half of 1953. This first vehicle was followed by a small batch of three improved vehicles that were evaluated by the armed forces in 1956–1957. The improved vehicles were powered by a new, horizontal six cylinder diesel engine, the YaMZ-206V, instead of the original V-6 of the PT-76. In 1958, the order to start series production of the SU-85—as it was initially known (although there was already a vehicle with that same name, based on the T-34)—was given. However, as a result of an order from the Ministry of Defense to add an armoured roof (the initial vehicles were still open-topped), series production could only begin in 1961. By then, the configuration was already out of date and in the second half of the 1960s, the VDV became the main operator of the SU-85 and renamed it the ASU-85.

== Design ==
The ASU-85 is based on the PT-76 tank chassis, but without the amphibious capabilities and fitted with a new engine. The vehicle has three compartments: the driver's in front, the combat compartment in the center, and the engine compartment at the rear.

The armament consists of a D-70 (2A15) 85 mm gun, derived from F.F. Petrov's D-48. The L/67 ordnance has a total weight of 1,865 kg and an elevation range from −4.50° to +15°. Traverse is 15° either side. The D-70 fires the same ammunition as the D-48 (3BK-7 HEAT, BR-372 APCBC-T and OF-372 HE), the combat load is 45 rounds. The gun has an effective range of 1,150 m and a maximum range of 10 km. It can penetrate 192 mm (7.6 in) of steel armor from an angle of 60° at a maximum distance of 1 km. The coaxial machine gun is either the SGMT or the PKT with a combat load of 2,000 rounds.

Both the main gun and the coaxial machine gun are aimed by means of the TShK-2-79 sight. For nighttime fire, the TPN1-79-11 sight is used in combination with the L-2 IR searchlight. Indirect fire is conducted with the help of the S-71-79 and PG-1 sights. Furthermore, the commander is provided with two observation devices; TNPK-20 (day) and TKN-1T (night).

All ASU-85s were provided with an R-113 radio and an R-120 intercom system. In the early 1970s, some vehicles were fitted with a DShK-M 12.7mm heavy machine gun with 600 rounds. These vehicles had a reduced combat load of 39 main gun rounds and received the NATO designator ASU-85 M1974. The original designation was SU-85M or ASU-85M. The ASU-85 could also be equipped with smoke generators BDSh-5.

== Service history ==
The Soviet Airborne Forces used the ASU-85 in airborne operations. Its primary role was light infantry support or assault, with limited anti-tank capability. Each airborne division had one assault gun battalion with 31 ASU-85.

The Soviet Union exported the ASU-85 to only two other Warsaw Pact member states: East Germany and Poland.

Airborne use of the ASU-85 became possible with the introduction of the Mi-6 and Mi-10 helicopters and high-capacity multi-chute and retro-rocket systems for fixed wing-drops. It was first observed by NATO in 1962, and was widely used by Soviet and Polish airborne units.

During the Soviet–Afghan War, Soviet Airborne troops used ASU-85s in combat.

In early 2016, Vietnam expressed interest in a Belarusian upgrade package for the ASU-85 that includes more powerful powerpack that increases road speed from 45 to 60 km/h (28 to 37 mph) and cruising range from 400 to 450 km (250 to 280 mi).

== Variants ==
There are no variants of the ASU-85, but its chassis served as the basis for other designs, such as the GM-575 chassis of the ZSU-23-4 "Shilka" and the GM-568 and GM-578 chassis' of the 2P25 launch vehicle and 1S91 radar vehicle of the 2K12 "Kub" system.

== Operators ==
=== Current operators ===
- Vietnam: At least 5 in service.
- Ukraine: At least one was utilized during the Russo-Ukrainian War.

=== Former operators ===
- Polish People's Republic: Poland received 31 ASU-85s in 1965. These were assigned to the 35th Self-propelled Artillery Squadron of the 6th Pomeranian Airborne Division in Kraków until their withdrawal in 1976, after which the unit was disbanded.
- Soviet Union: The Soviet Army operated ASU-85 in airborne divisions of Soviet Airborne Forces.
- East Germany: Unknown number in service in the 1970s.

== Surviving vehicles ==
- Poland
  - Polish Army Museum in Warsaw – tactical number 1601, on display at the Museum of Polish Military Technology;
  - Artillery Museum in Toruń
  - White Eagle Museum in Skarżysko-Kamienna – tactical number 9011,
  - Polish Arms Museum in Kołobrzeg,
  - Armoured Weapons Museum in Poznań
  - Military Museum in Suwałki.
- Russia
  - Kubinka Tank Museum – tactical number 057
  - Monument in Omsk
  - Two monuments on a military site in Pskov
- Ukraine
  - Museum of Military Equipment in the Park of Peace in Kremenchuk
  - Monument in Bessarabske – tactical number 328
