= Hydronalium =

Type of aluminium-magnesium alloy

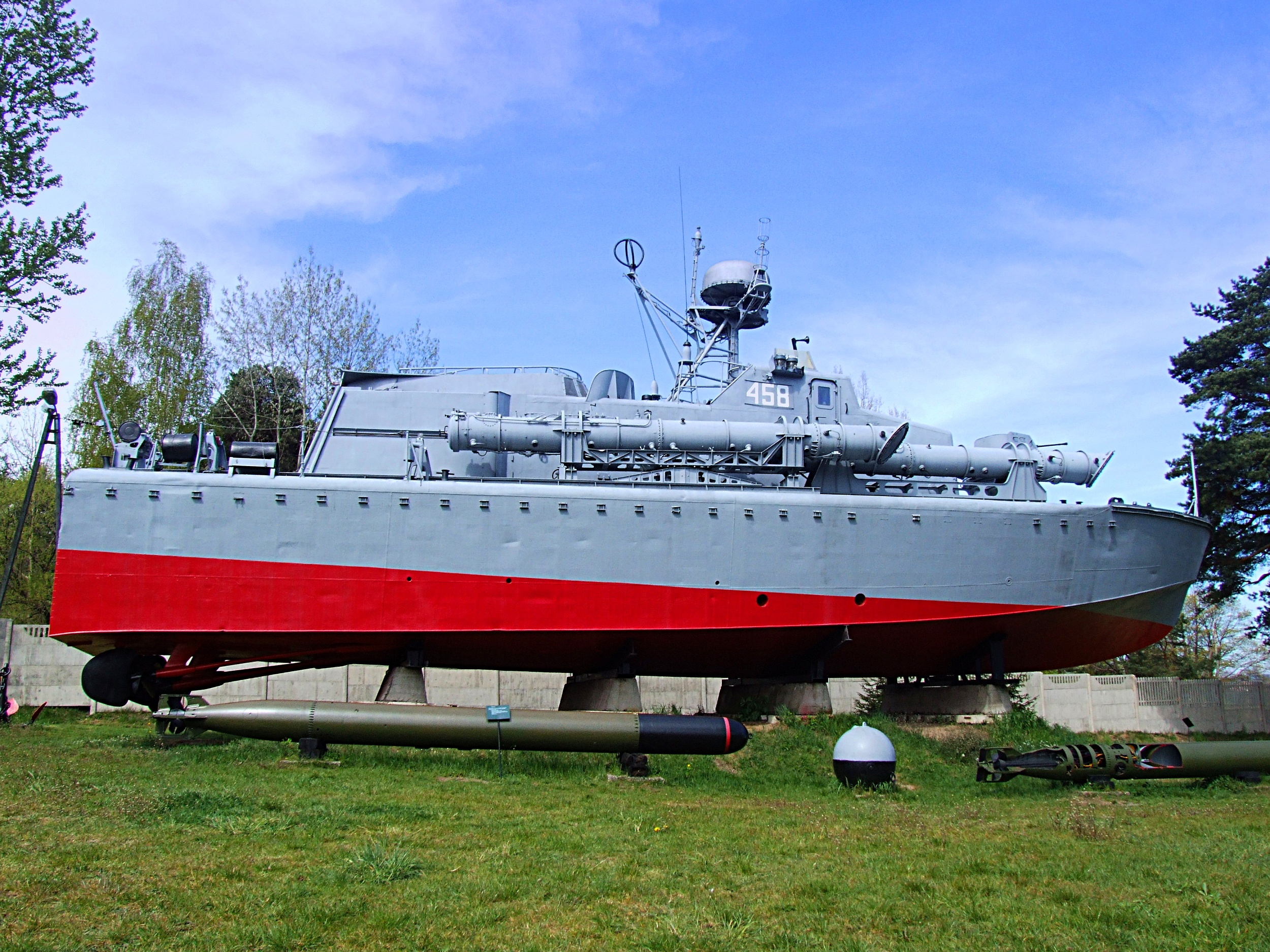
Polish project 664-class torpedo boat, with a hull of welded Hydronalium

Hydronalium is a family of aluminium-magnesium alloys. It is an alloy predominantly of aluminium, with between 1%-12% of magnesium as the primary alloying ingredient. It also includes a secondary addition of manganese, usually between 0.4%-1%.

The Hydronalium alloys originated in Germany in the 1930s and are best known, at least by that name, in Eastern Europe. They were widely used for shipbuilding in Poland.

There are many alloys within this family, one standard reference listing over twenty.

Mechanical properties
Alloy	Hardening	Tensile strength	Yield strength	Elongation (%)	Hardness (Brinell)
Hydronalium 2	Soft	193 MPa (28,000 psi)	90 MPa (13,000 psi)	30	47
Hydronalium 2	Hard	290 MPa (42,000 psi)	255 MPa (37,000 psi)	8	77

== Applications ==
The alloy family is noted for its resistance to seawater corrosion. As such it is used in sheet form for boatbuilding and light shipbuilding. As castings it is used for marine fittings. The reliable strength of some grades is sufficient for aerospace use and so they are used for wetted components of seaplane aircraft, such as floats and propellers, where marine corrosion resistance is also needed.

Some variants of the alloy are ductile enough to be drawn into wire. This, combined with their resistance to corrosion by salty sweat, has led to an application for violin strings as an alternative to silver.

== See also ==
- 5083 aluminium alloy
