= Project 664-class torpedo boat =

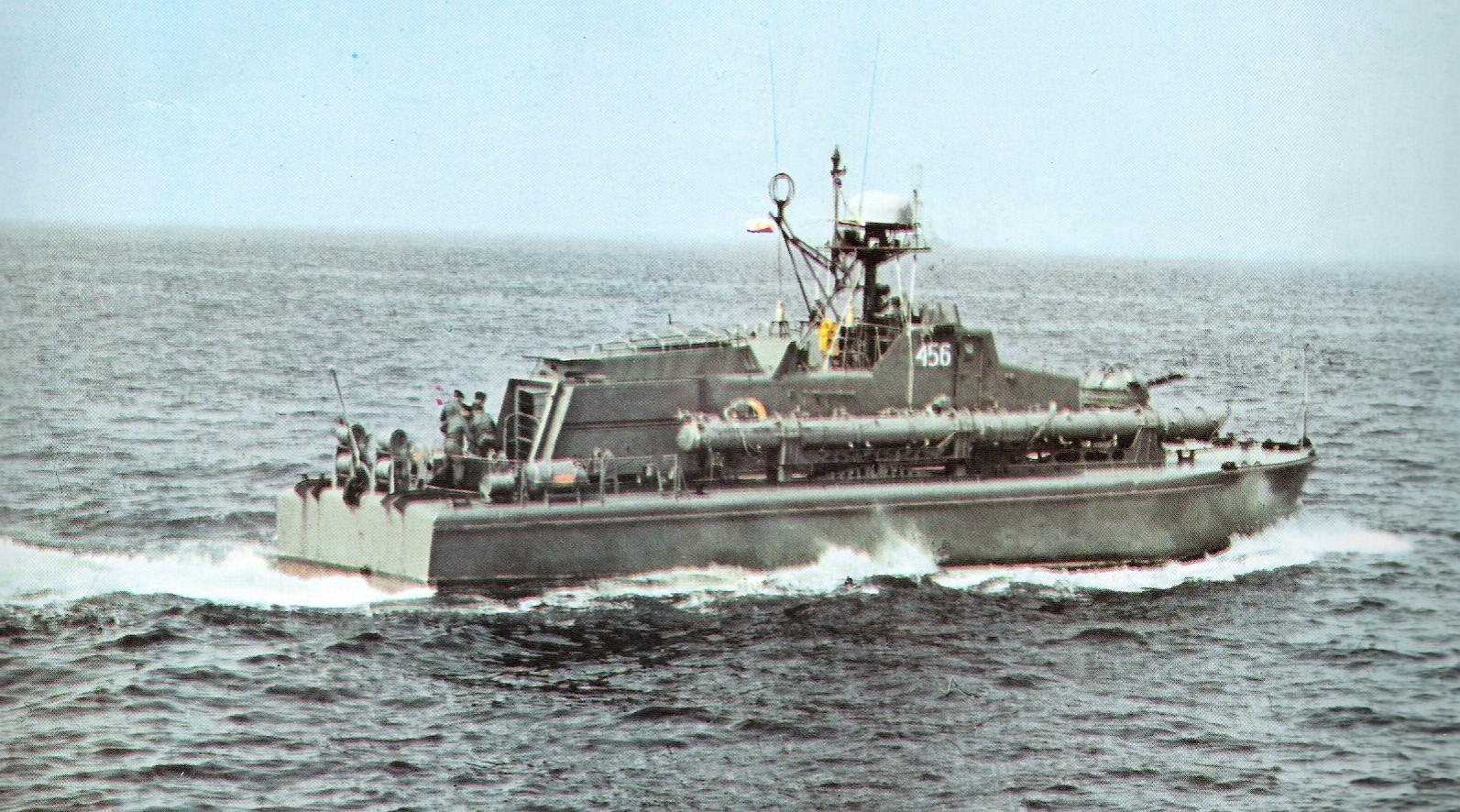
- ORP Sprawny in the 1980s

Class overview
- Name: Project 664 class torpedo boat
- Builders: Stocznia Pólnocna, Gdańsk
- Operators: Polish Navy
- Built: 1961-1972
- In commission: 1965-1980s
- Completed: 8
- Retired: 8
- Scrapped: 7
- Preserved: 1

General characteristics
- Type: Torpedo boat
- Displacement: 94 t (93 long tons) standard; 128 t (126 long tons) full
- Length: 24.76 m (81 ft 3 in)
- Beam: 7.79 m (25 ft 7 in)
- Draft: 1.61 m (5 ft 3 in)
- Propulsion: CODAG; 4 × M-50F3 diesel engines, each 1,200 PS (883 kW); 1 × TM-1 gas turbine, 5,132 PS (3,775 kW) sustained power, 7,200 PS (5,296 kW) max power; 4 × propeller shafts
- Speed: 49.28 knots (91.27 km/h; 56.71 mph) maximum; 43 kn (80 km/h; 49 mph) max sustained; 28 kn (52 km/h; 32 mph) travel
- Range: 410 nmi (760 km; 470 mi) at 16 kn (30 km/h; 18 mph)
- Complement: 20 officers and enlisted
- Sensors & processing systems: MR-102 surveillance and torpedo fire control radar
- Armament: Twin AK-230 gun with Kolonka optical sight, 1000 rounds of ammunition; 4 × 533 mm (21 in) torpedo tubes, 4 torpedoes; Minelaying capabilities: 2 aft torpedo tubes can be exchanged with ramps for 2 × AMD-1000 or 4 × AMD-500 or 20 × JaM naval mines

The Project 664 (NATO reporting name Wisla) class were Polish torpedo boats, designed in Poland in the 1970s. They were one of the few vessels of this size, powered by a gas turbine, and could achieve a great speed.

== Development ==
In the late 1950s the Polish Navy decided to develop fast torpedo boats of own design, to supplement Soviet-origin project 183 (P-6) class torpedo boats. It was decided to use a gas turbine for propulsion and arm them with four torpedo tubes. Due to lack of previous experience in designing such craft, development was very long. In order to test the technology, a single experimental project 663D torpedo boat was built, ORP Błyskawiczny. Her building started in 1961 and she entered service in 1965. Trials revealed some faults, and further development work was carried out. The result were the boats of the final project 664. They shared a similar silhouette, hull shape and a propulsion fit of 4 diesel and a TM-1 gas turbine engine in a CODAG arrangement. The gas turbine itself was an adaptation of a licence-built Klimov VK-1 aircraft jet engine. The gas turbine being used at speeds above 12 knots.

From 1968, eight boats were built in Stocznia Północna (Northern Shipyard) in Gdańsk. They were given numbers from KTD-452 to KTD-459 (an abbreviation of kuter torpedowy duży - "torpedo boat, large") and names.

== Service ==
The boats entered service in the Polish Navy in 1971–1972, and were assigned to the 3rd Navy Flotilla (along with ORP Błyskawiczny).

The design was overall not successful. First of all, the hulls, made of hydronalium (aluminium alloy), had limited durability, especially when sailing at high speed on a rough sea, resulting in cracks. Propulsion was also not optimal, the gas turbine was not fuel efficient limiting range, and there were problems with the gearing of paired engines. The boats were very compact, and were not comfortable for the crews, being cramped, noisy and prone to vibration. Their advantage of very high top speed, was however limited by sea conditions.

Due to service problems and wear, project 664 class boats were relatively quickly phased out in the 1980s, after only 9 to 14 years of service.

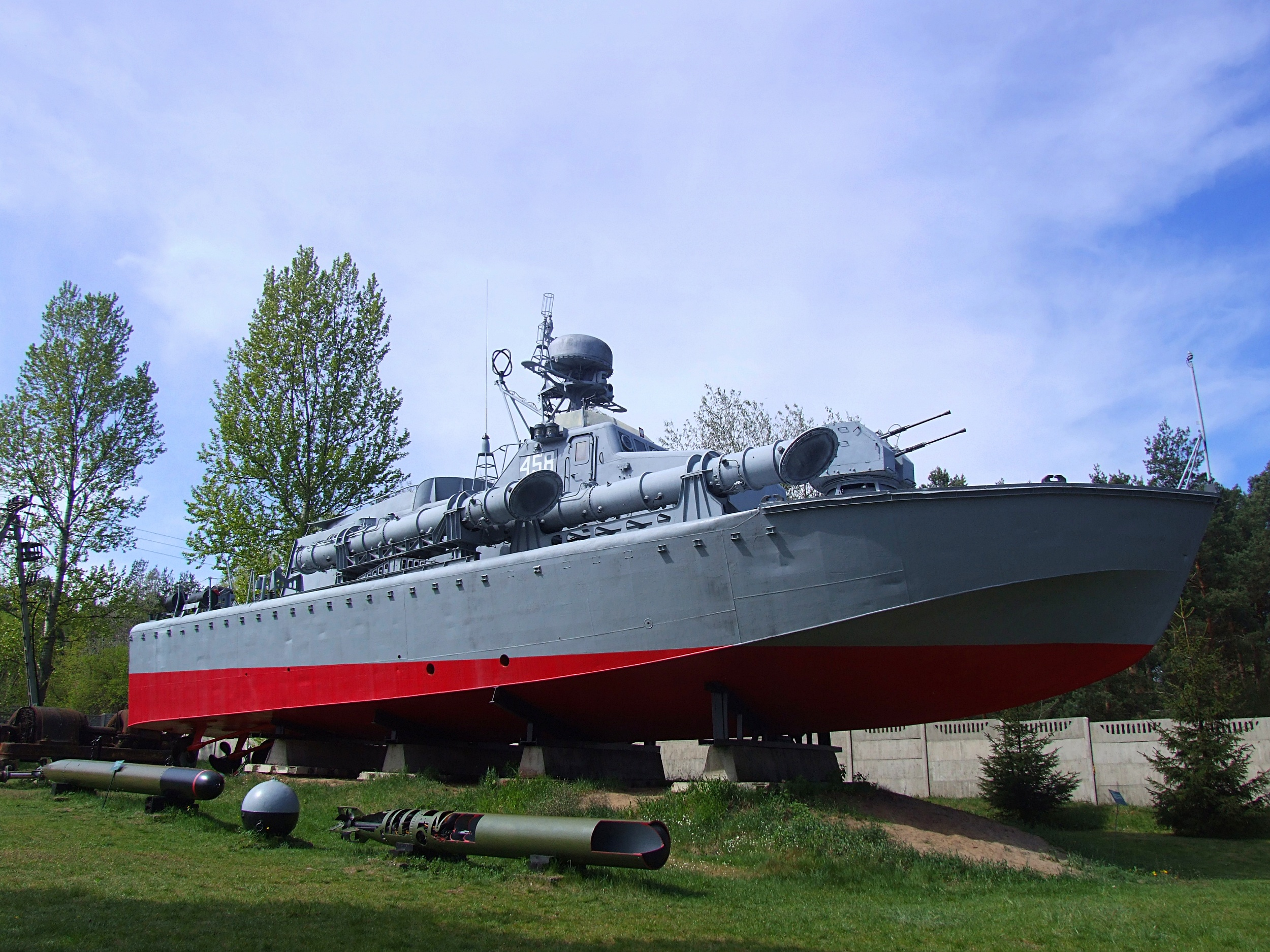
ORP Odważny in the White Eagle Museum in Skarżysko-Kamienna

The only one preserved was ORP Odważny - in 1990 it was given to the White Eagle Museum in Skarżysko-Kamienna. Its original twin 30 mm AK-230 gun is however replaced with twin 25 mm 2M-3M gun.

== List of boats ==
Number	Name	Laid down	Launched	Com- missioned	Decom- missioned
KTD-452	ORP Bitny	15 August 1968	15 September 1969	20 January 1972	31 January 1986
KTD-453	ORP Bystry	20 February 1969	29 March 1970	20 January 1972	31 December 1983
KTD-454	ORP Dzielny	15 December 1969	20 October 1970	22 July 1972	31 December 1981
KTD-455	ORP Dziarski	16 June 1970	30 November 1971	20 October 1972	31 December 1984
KTD-456	ORP Sprawny	23 November 1970	29 May 1972	13 January 1973	15 November 1986
KTD-457	ORP Szybki	16 December 1971	29 September 1972	28 April 1973	31 August 1984
KTD-458	ORP Odważny	7 April 1972	21 February 1973	15 September 1973	31 January 1986
KTD-459	ORP Odporny	8 August 1972	31 May 1973	17 November 1973	15 November 1986
