= Troop commander =

Troop commander is an appointment used by a number of countries to signify the officer in command of a troop, a traditional cavalry or artillery sub unit.

== British Army ==
A troop commander is an officer in the British Army, who commands 15 other soldiers (a troop) and their vehicles. A troop usually consists of four or sometimes more armoured vehicles such as tanks and APCs. While serving in the Household Cavalry, Prince Harry was a reconnaissance troop commander, commanding six scimitar LRV-Cs.

== Canadian Army ==
A troop commander (TC) is normally a junior officer (2nd lieutenant or lieutenant) in the Royal Canadian Artillery or Royal Canadian Armoured Corps.

== Red Army ==
A troop commander is the senior officer in command of a Red Army cavalry troop. The rank is usually that of a captain, or senior lieutenant.

A cavalry troop is equivalent in size and general strength to a rifle (infantry) company. A cavalry troop normally has five platoons.

- The HQ platoon is made up of the HQ section (administrative personnel), and all the support sections, such as mess, supply (trooper equipment), quartermaster (mount/horse equipment), medical, and maintenance (both vehicles, and tack).
- First platoon: This is the attack platoon, composed of the most experienced troopers in the unit. This platoon conducts direct action against enemy forces. It may engage in direct attacks, or flanking manoeuvres on enemy forces, and positions.
- Second platoon: One of the two scouting/reconnaissance platoons that engage in reconnaissance activities against enemy positions, troop concentrations, and rear area targets of interest (such as ammo dumps, bridges, railroad marshalling yards). This platoon observes enemy activity, and reports by radio, land line, or semaphore to HQ the enemies activities. Such units tend to operate in small groups, or sections, and so avoid direct enemy contact whenever possible.
- Third platoon: Composed the same as second platoon.
- Fourth platoon: This is the speciality platoon. It contains all unit snipers, any heavy weapons provided to the troop, and will lead in both the defensive operations of the troop area, as well as provide primary support to the first platoon in any of its direct action attacks against the enemy.

This typical formation was used by the 25th Ukrainian Mounted Rifle Regiment, a mounted rifle unit of the Ukrainian territorial defense army of the Red Army of the Soviet Union. Although disbanded, it is commemorated by living historians in the North East United States.
