= White Eagle Museum =

- Muzeum im Orla Bialego
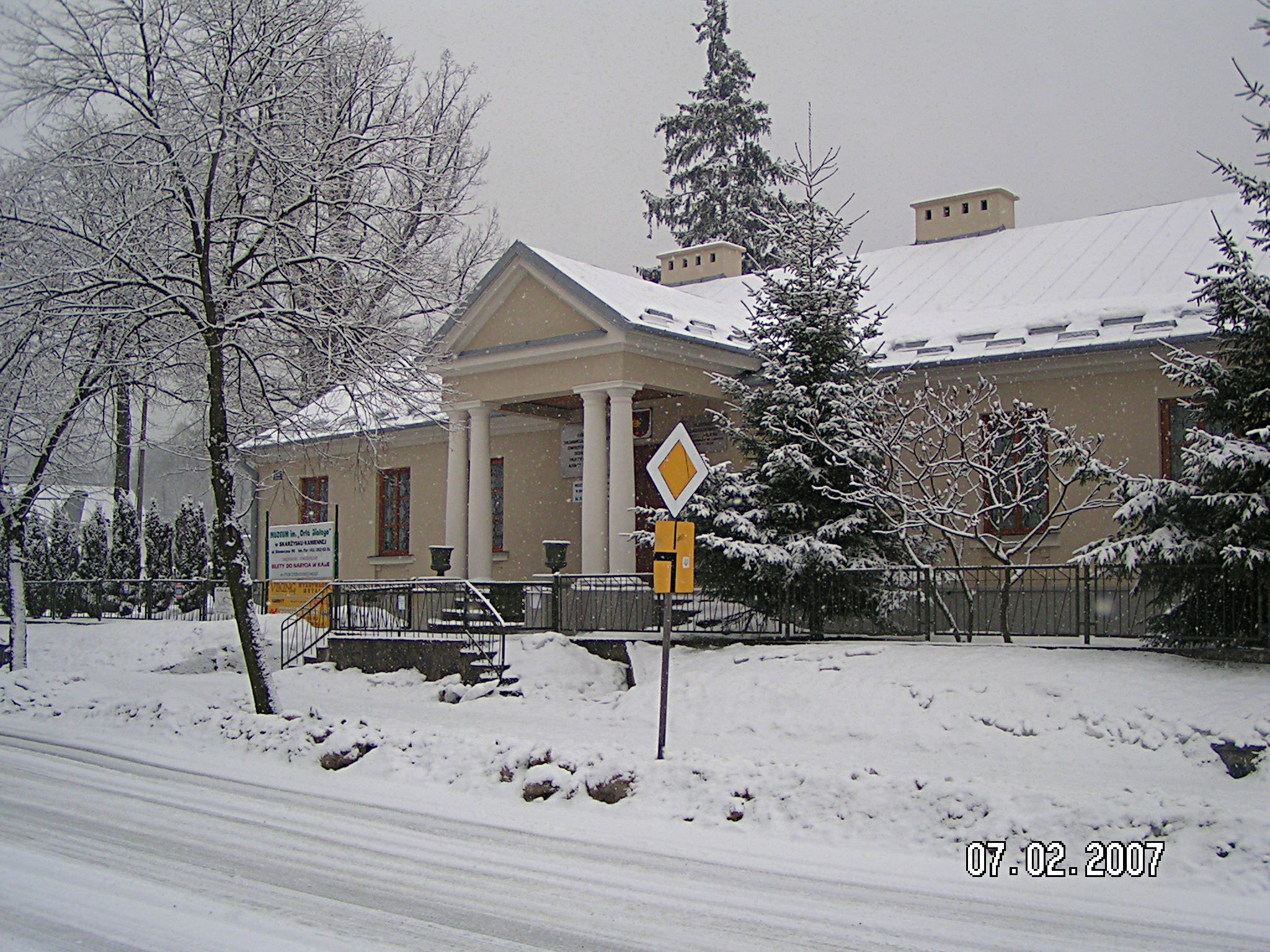
- Main building

- Location within Poland
- Established: 1969
- Location: 90 Słoneczna Street; 26-110 Skarżysko-Kamienna; Poland
- Coordinates: 51.087728°N 20.850264°E
- Type: Military museum
- Website: muzeum.skarzysko.pl

The White Eagle Museum (Polish: Muzeum im. Orła Białego) is a Polish military museum located in the town of Skarżysko-Kamienna in the central Świętokrzyskie Voivodeship, opened in 1969.

== Museum ==
The museum has a large collection of Russian, Polish and German World War II and post-war military equipment. The military equipment is displayed in a permanent outdoor exhibition covering 2 hectares (4.9 acres), and includes tanks, artillery pieces, armoured vehicles, rockets and aircraft. The museum also collects documents and historical materials relating to the history of the city and the region, and objects related to military history from World War II onwards.

The museum is housed in the former residence of the superintendent of the Rejów foundry, which was built in 1836–1838. It houses exhibitions pertaining to local industry, including Państwowa Fabryka Amunicji (The National Ammunition Factory). During World War II, the munitions factory was taken over by the German company, HASAG, and used forced labour. Members of a local resistance group Orzel Bialy (White Eagle) were captured, shot and buried in two mass graves in nearby forests. The museum commemorates them, and the thousands of unprotected forced labourers poisoned by picric acid fumes used in ammunition production. There are other exhibits on the Leśni partisans, the People's Army of Poland and the Polish Army in the West.

== Exhibits ==
The exhibits include:

- T-34-85 tank
- BTR-60 armoured personnel carrier
- CW-34 armoured recovery vehicle
- Katyusha rocket launcher
- StuG IV tank destroyer
- Lim-6 ground-attack aircraft
- MiG-21 jet fighter
- Su-7 jet fighter
- Yak-23 jet fighter
- Il-14 transport aircraft
- ORP Odwazny, a Project 664 class torpedo boat

== Gallery ==
Exhibits
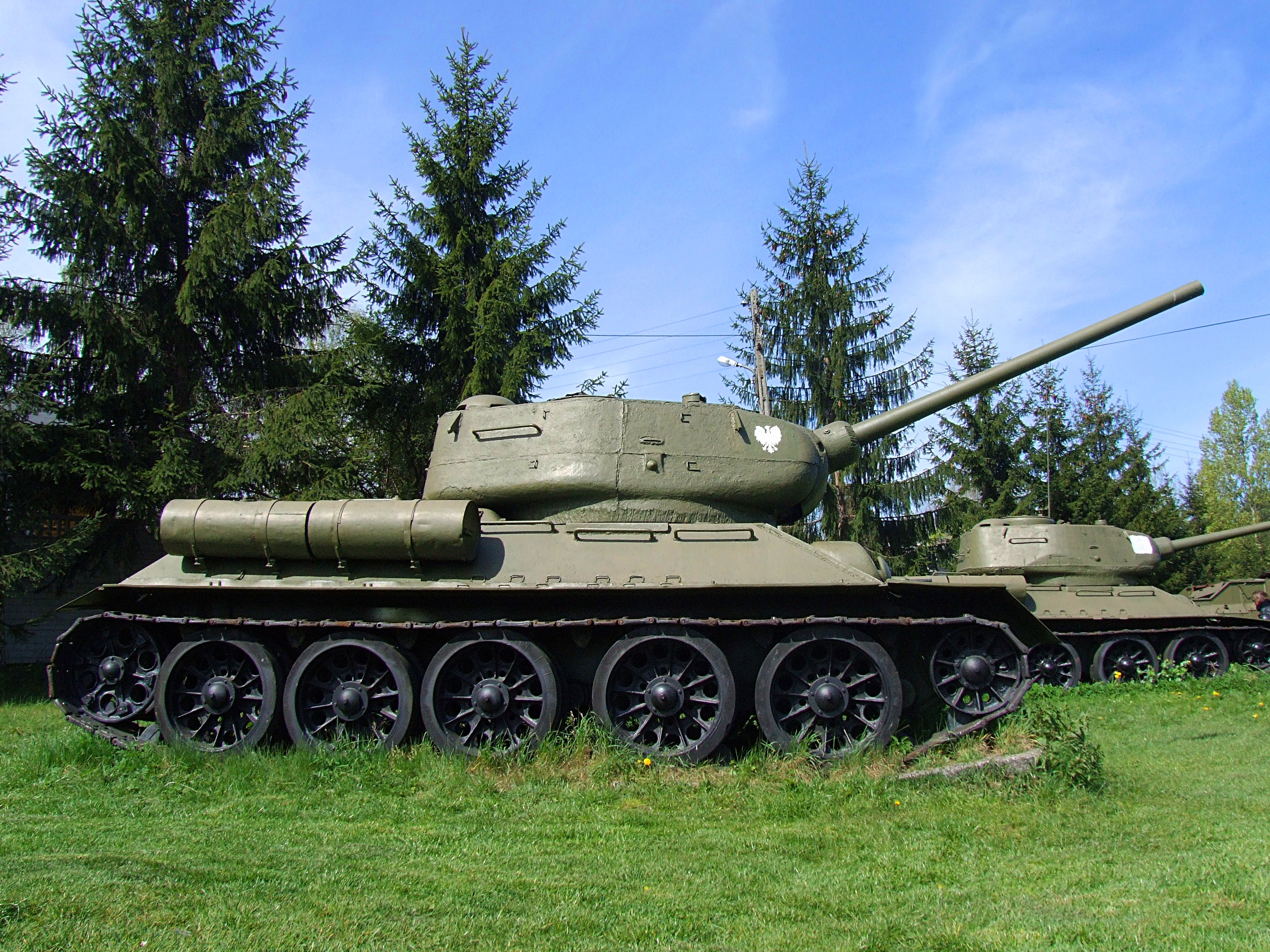
T-34-85 tank

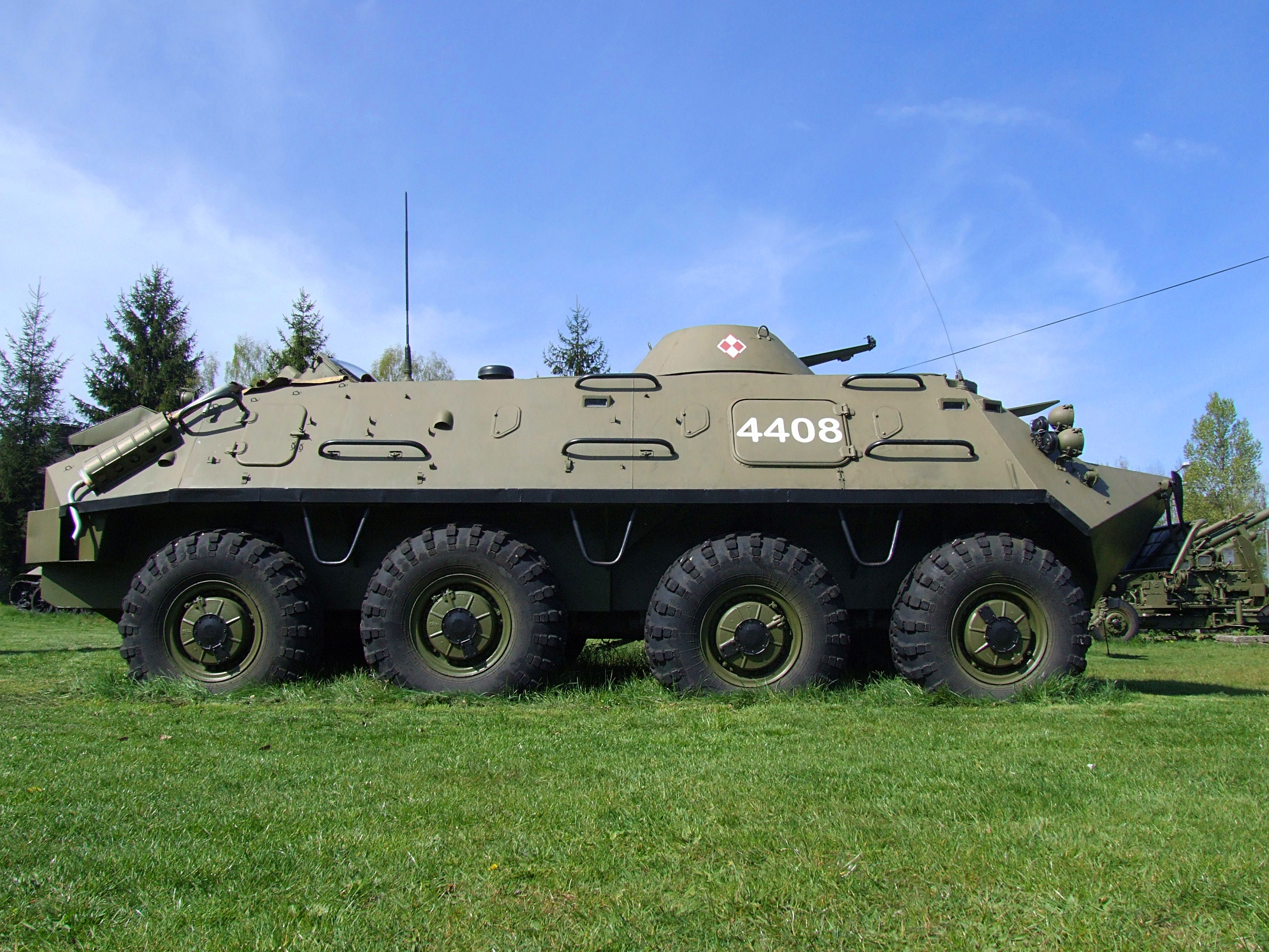
BTR-60PB armoured personnel carrier

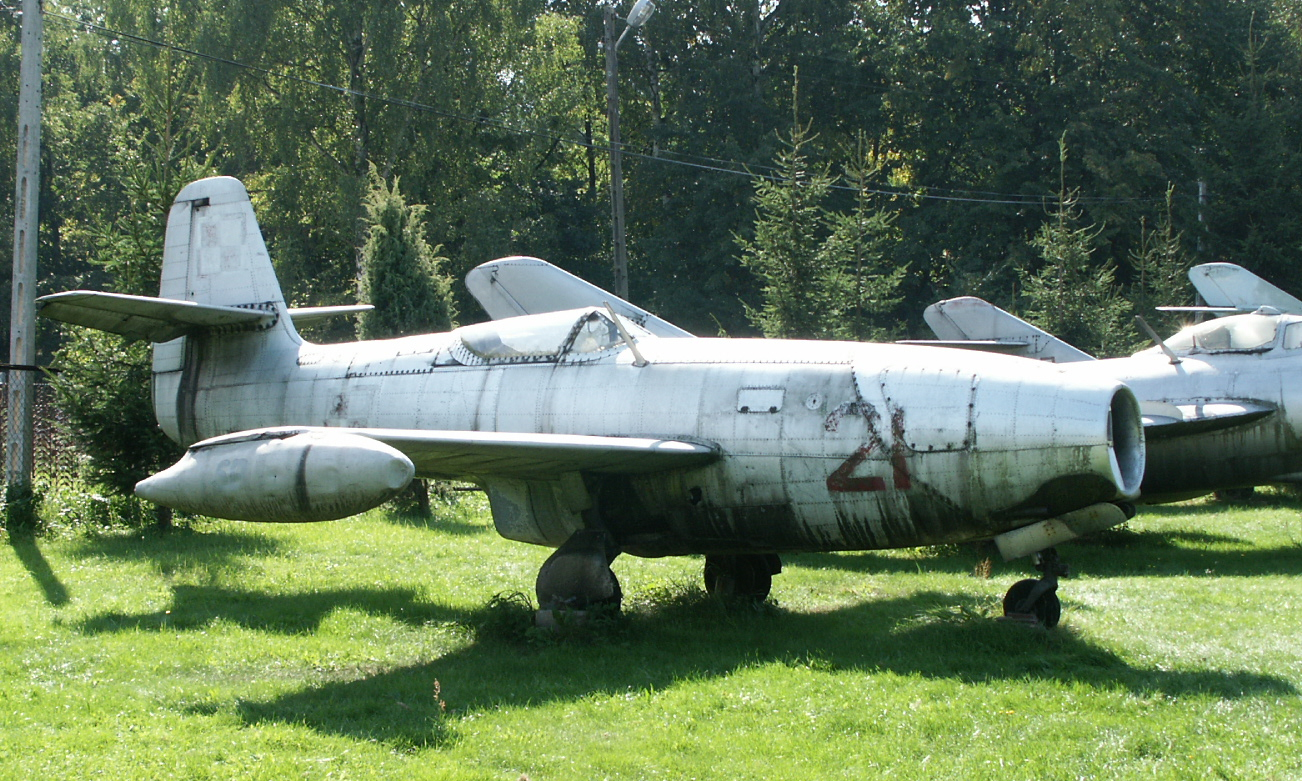
Yak-23 aircraft

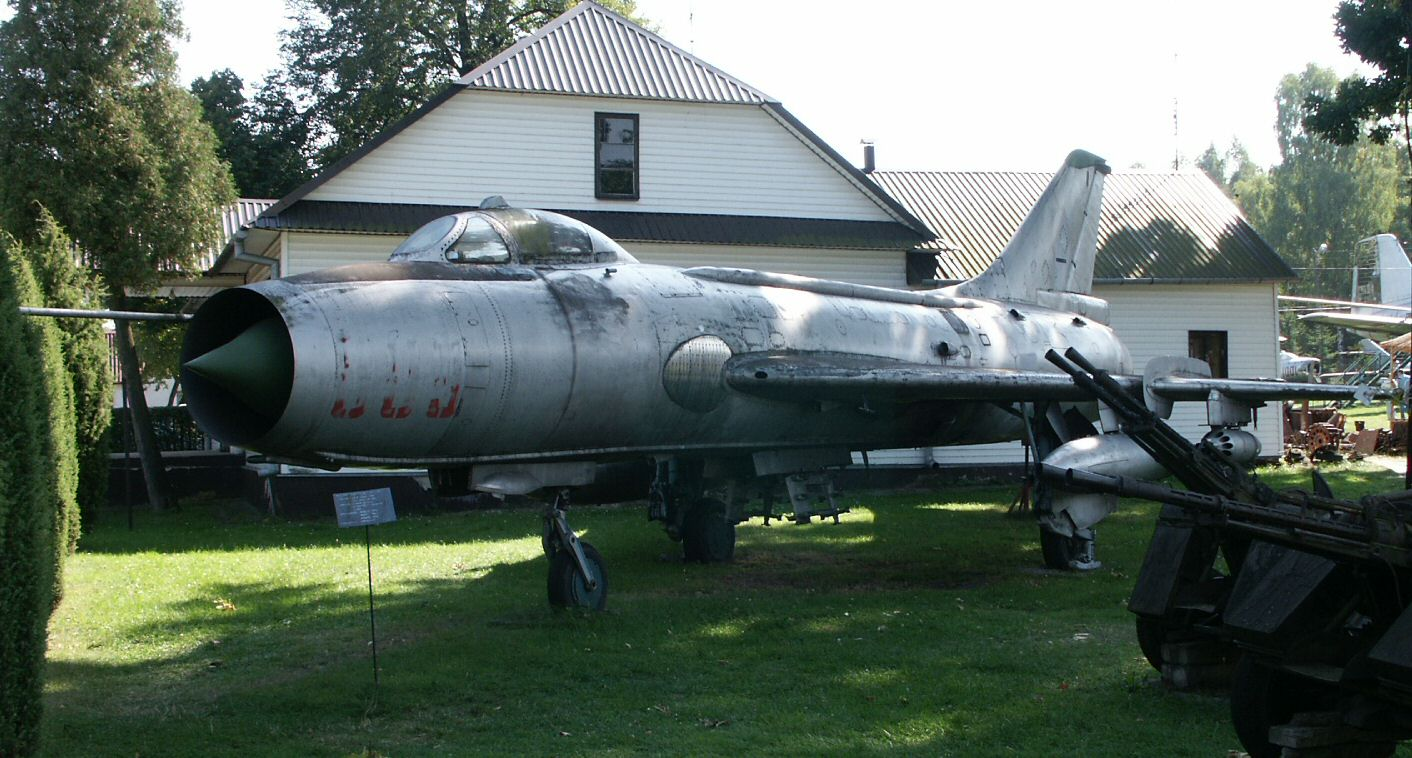
Su-7BKL aircraft

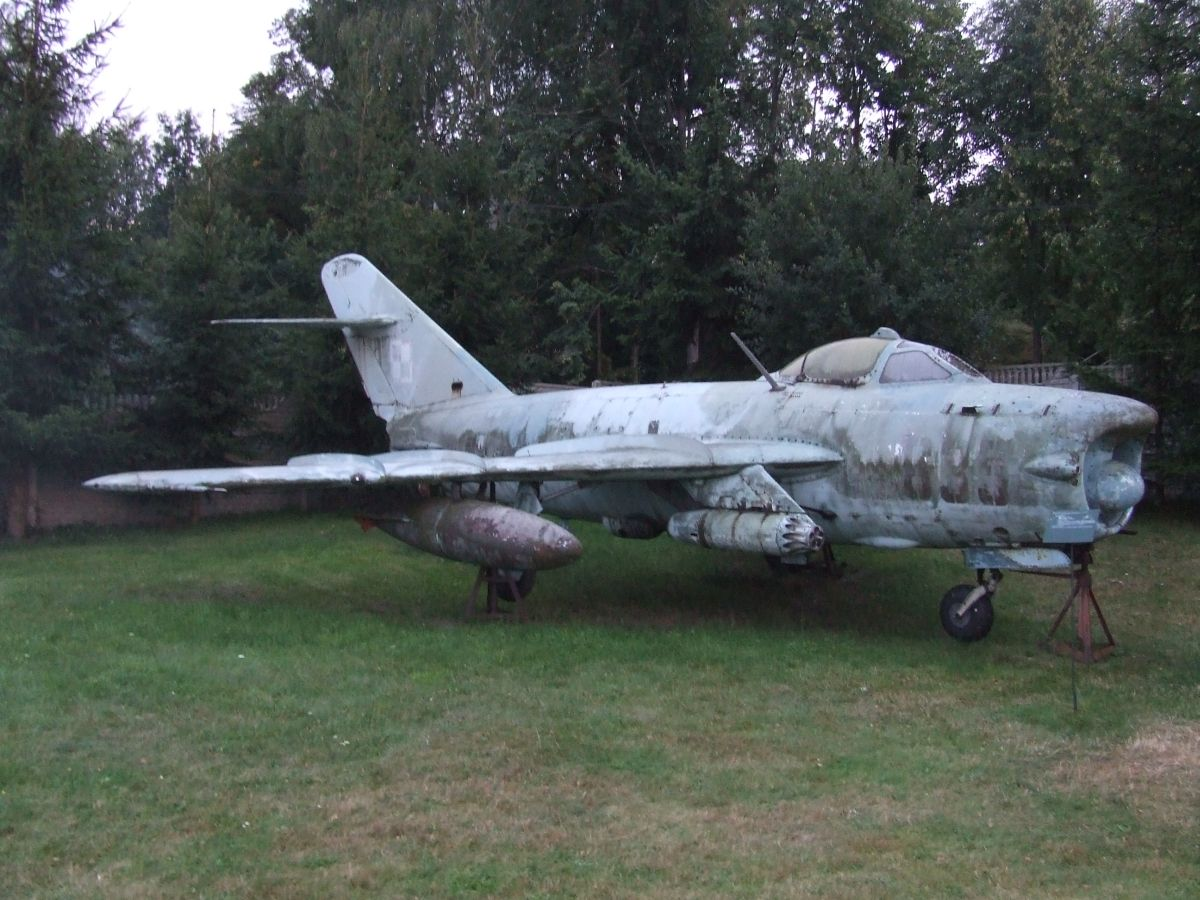
Lim-6M aircraft

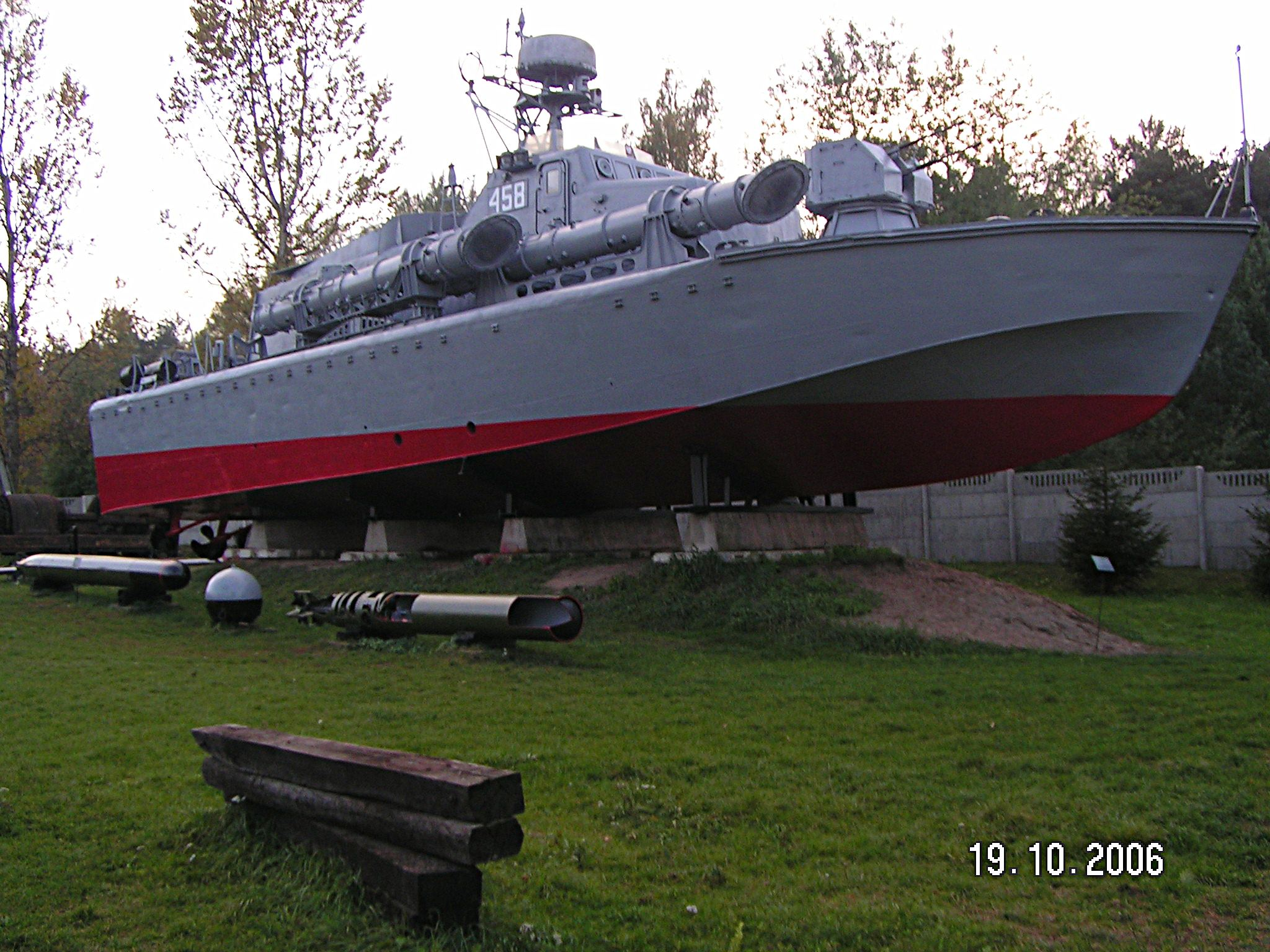
Torpedo boat ORP Odwazny
