= ASU-57 =

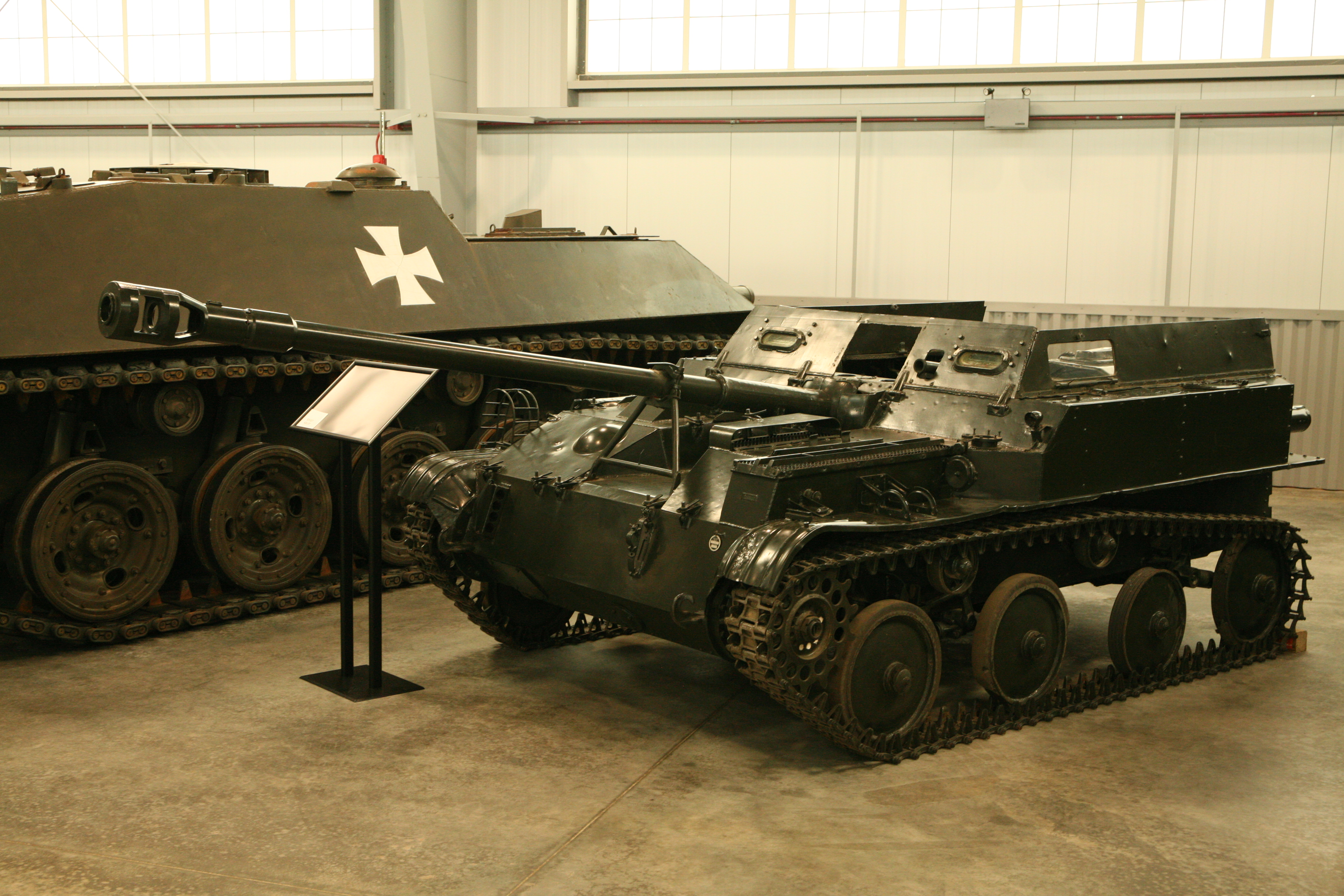
- ASU-57 on display at the U.S. Army Armor and Cavalry Collection
- Type: Airborne assault gun
- Place of origin: Soviet Union

Service history
- In service: 1951 – late 1960s (USSR)
- Used by: USSR; Egypt; Vietnam; Yugoslavia; Ethiopia; East Germany
- Wars: Six-Day War; Warsaw Pact invasion of Czechoslovakia; Ogaden War

Production history
- Designer: Astrov Design Bureau
- Manufacturer: MMZ
- Produced: 1950-1962

Specifications
- Mass: 3.4 to 4 t (3.3 to 3.9 long tons; 3.7 to 4.4 short tons)
- Length: 3.48 m (11 ft 5 in) (hull)
- Width: 2.08 m (6 ft 10 in)
- Height: 1.18 m (3 ft 10 in) (shield up)
- Crew: 3+6
- Armor: 6 mm (0.24 in)
- Main armament: 1x Ch-51 or Ch-51M L/73 57mm Gun
- Secondary armament: 1x 7.62mm anti-aircraft machine gun
- Engine: one M-20E4 water cooled gasoline engine 50hp (37.29 kW) (55hp with later engine)
- Transmission: 37,000/75,000 now
- Suspension: torsion bar
- Fuel capacity: 140 liters (37 gallons)
- Operational range: 250 km (160 mi)
- Maximum speed: 45 km/h (28 mph)

The ASU-57 was a small, lightly constructed Soviet assault gun specifically designed for use by Soviet airborne divisions. From 1960 onwards, it was gradually phased out in favour of the ASU-85.

== Development history ==
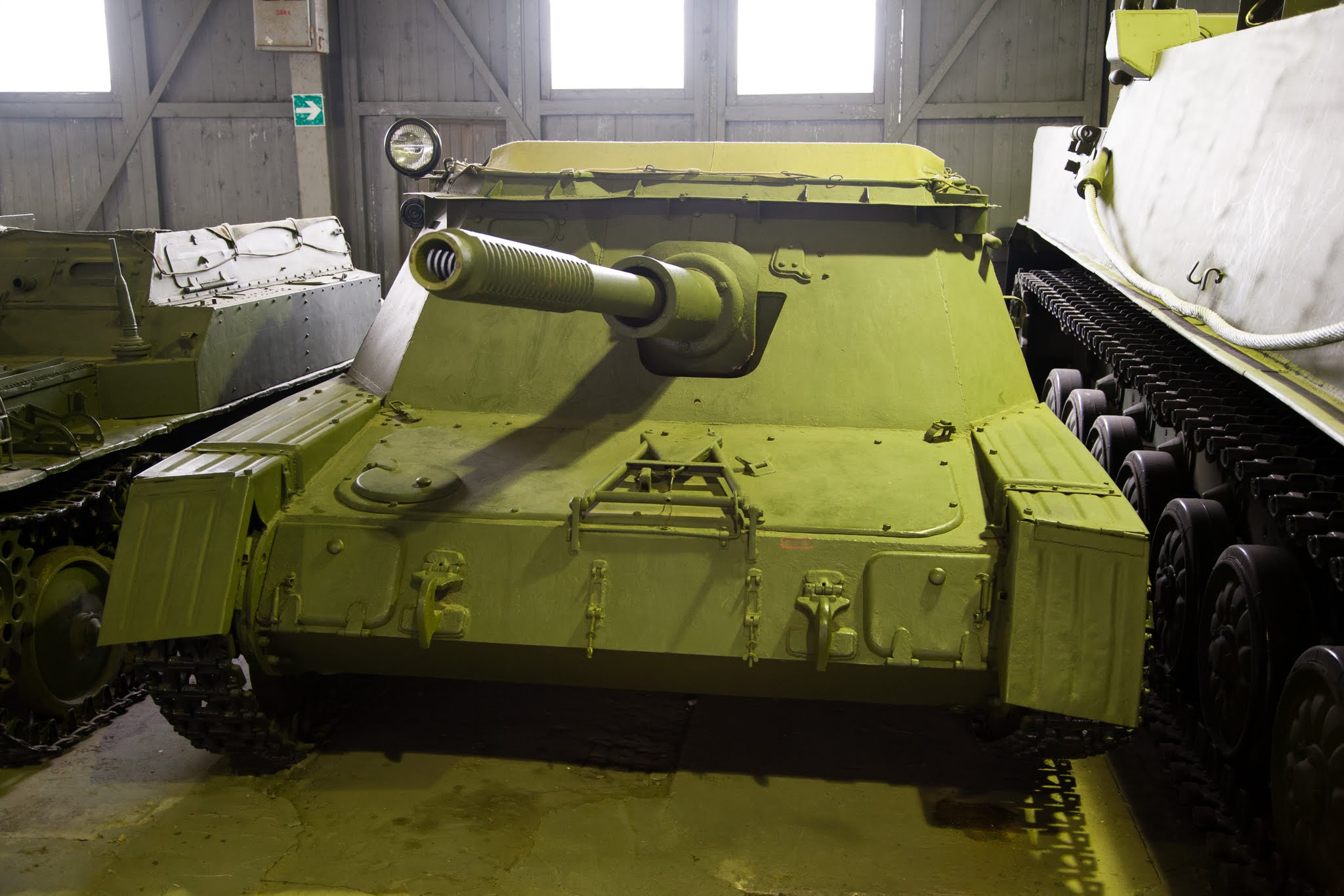
ASU-76

The task to develop a lightweight assault gun for the airborne troops (with either a 57 mm gun or a 76 mm gun) was given to two design bureaus, Astrov (OKB-40) in Mytishchi and Kravtsev in Moscow. Nikolaj Astrov's OKB-40 designed the ASU-76, based on components of the T-70 light tank and the SU-76 assault gun, and armed with the new 76 mm gun D-56T. The ASU-76 turned out to be too heavy, even though the armour was only 3 mm thick, and the project was cancelled. Anatoly Kravtsev's team came up with the similar, amphibious K-73. This vehicle was armed with Charnko's 57 mm anti-tank gun Ch-51 and was even more thinly armoured than the ASU-76. This project too was shelved.

In 1949, Astrov was instructed to continue with his project, but with reduced weight and with the Ch-51 gun as the main armament instead of the D-56T, since it offered better anti-tank performance. The redesigned Ob.572 was developed simultaneously with the Ob.561 (AT-P) light artillery tractor. After successfully passing the various test phases in 1949, it was accepted for series production from 1951 as the ASU-57.

== Design ==
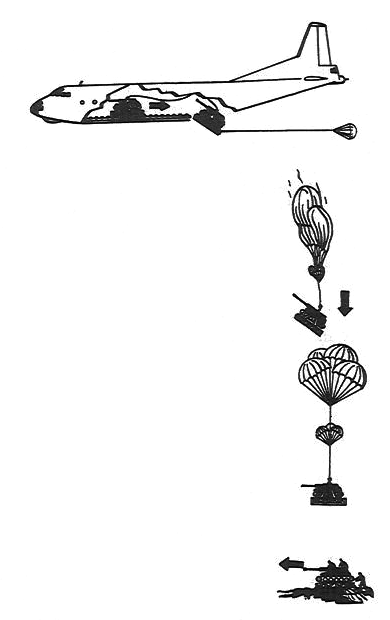
ASU-57's paradropping sequence from An-12 transport plane.

=== Armament ===
The ASU-57 was designed to be a lightweight assault gun that could be air-dropped out of the An-12 transport plane which was the standard cargo aircraft of the Soviet military at the time and deployed by rocket-assisted parachute (PP-128-500 or P-7) along with the troops. It was lightly armored and armed with a 57 mm gun Ch-51, a development of the World War II ZIS-2 but with some similarities to the Ch-26. From 1954, an improved 57 mm gun Ch-51M with a much shorter double-baffle muzzle brake was fitted. The gun fired the standard caliber 57x480R ammunition of the ZIS-2 anti-tank gun, such as the BR-271 series and the O-271U, of which it had 30 on board, stored in various ammunition racks located at the rear of the vehicle and in easy reach of the loader, who sat facing backwards. The ASU-57 was also able to be fitted with an optional 7.62 mm DTM with 2500 rounds or 12.7 mm DShK machine gun.

=== Propulsion ===
The ASU-57's M-20E4 engine was taken from the GAZ-M-20 "Pobeda" civilian car and featured 50 hp (37 kW) of power. The engine was located on the left side of the transmission, which was located at the front of the vehicle and connected to frontal sprocket wheels driving tracks with four rubberised roadwheels on each side, with the last one acting as an idler wheel. The ASU-57 could reach a maximum speed of 45 km/h and had a 250 km range.

=== Protection ===
Designed to be as light as possible, the ASU-57 featured very limited armour in the form of steel plates that were a maximum of 6 mm thick at the front of the vehicle that was either bolted or welded on. The armour was only intended to resist rifle-calibre bullets fired by infantry and could be defeated easily by heavy machine guns such as the 12.7 mm M2 Browning. The top of the vehicle was completely open and thus exposed the crew to both the elements and enemy fire, especially in the form of grenades. If a crew stood up completely in the vehicle, their heads would be in view. Rather, the ASU-57 was intended to use its small size and mobility to avoid enemy fire. The open topped-nature of the vehicle also facilitated good vision and situational awareness for the crew, as well as easy access into and out of the vehicle.

== Operational history ==
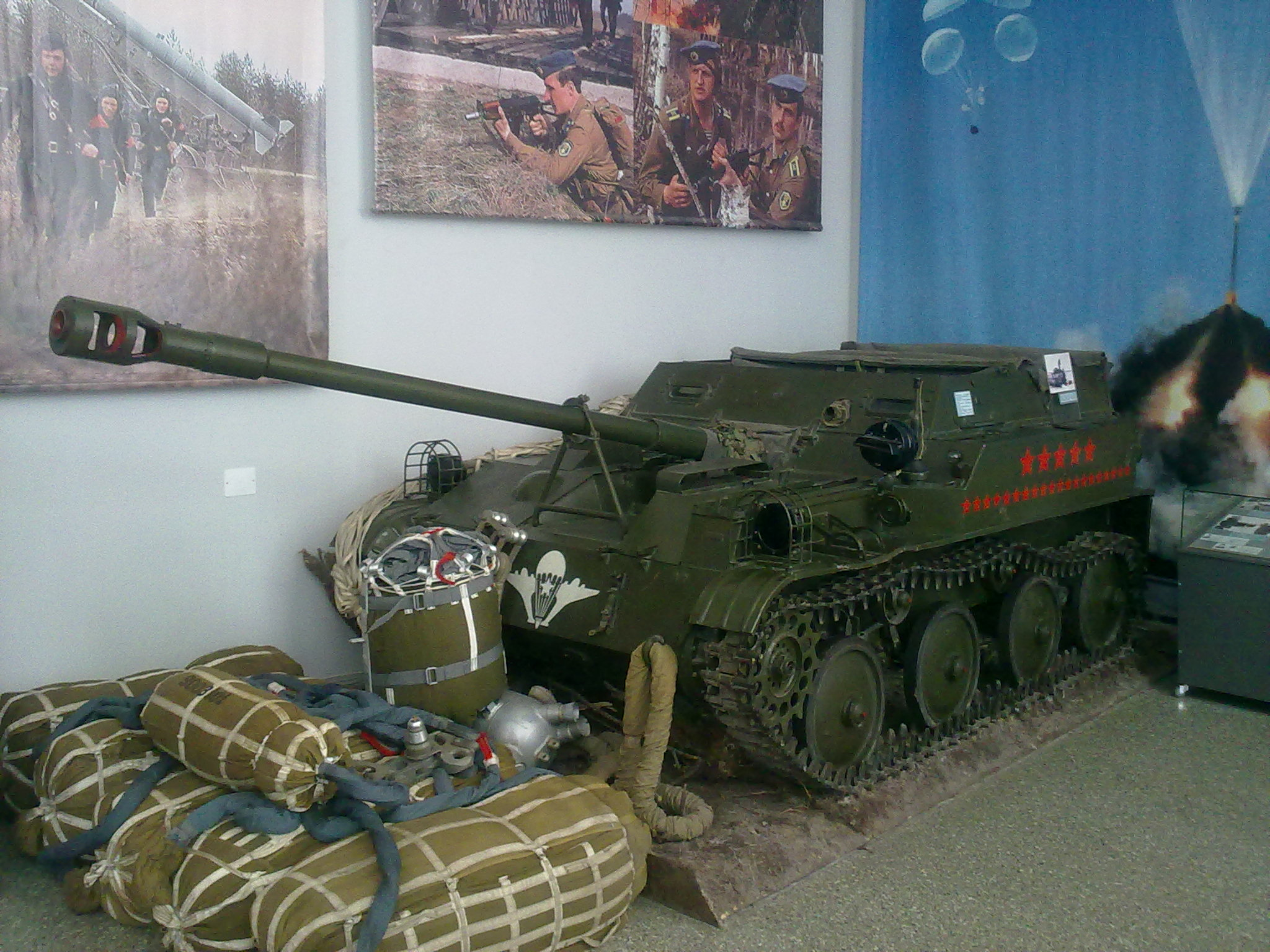
ASU-57. Packed parachute system in the foreground

The ASU-57 was a successful design that saw service with Soviet airborne divisions for around 20 years before being replaced by the ASU-85. During its years of operation, 54 vehicles would have been assigned to each airborne division. One main drawback was the vehicle's welded aluminium hull, which offered little protection for the crew. However the vehicle gave lightly armed airborne troops mobile artillery support on the battlefield. Every vehicle was equipped with a 10RT-12 radio and a TPU-47 intercom system. Late-production models (from 1961) replaced these with the R-113 and R-120 respectively, and also had a TVN-2 night vision device for the driver.

The ASU-57 became the first successful Soviet airborne tank, overcoming failings in previous Soviet concepts that had stemmed from the 1930s. When the ASU-57 was introduced, every airborne division acquired 54 vehicles each, however by the turn of the 1960s, the ASU-57s only numbered 245 in service. It was realised that the armament of the main gun, a WWII-derived design, was vastly obsolete, especially when compared to NATO-equivalents such as the M40 recoilless rifle. The ASU-57 saw its first major deployment during Dniepr, a 1967 military exercise performed by the 76th VDD. In the following year, in 1968, ASU-57s saw its first combat-action during the Warsaw Pact-invasion of Czechoslovakia, with several vehicles used by the USSR. The ASU-57 was gradually supplanted and replaced by the heavier ASU-85, which featured a fully enclosed casemate design with a vastly superior 85 mm main gun. According to Isby, some apparently were kept for training as late as 1988, while unarmed command versions remained in service until they were replaced by command versions of the BMD-1.

In foreign military service, 20 ASU-57s saw service with the East German military, while 200 were given to North Korea. ASU-57s were also supplied to Egyptian forces, being used in the Six-Day War against Israel in 1967. Several dozen ASU-57s were sent to Ethiopia as well, where they took part in the Ogaden War with Somalia in November 1977, where ASU-57s were used in battles around Areva and Jijiga, assisting friendly forces during the battle, where notably, Mi-6 helicopters dropped at least several ASU-57s behind the Somali frontlines.

== Variants ==
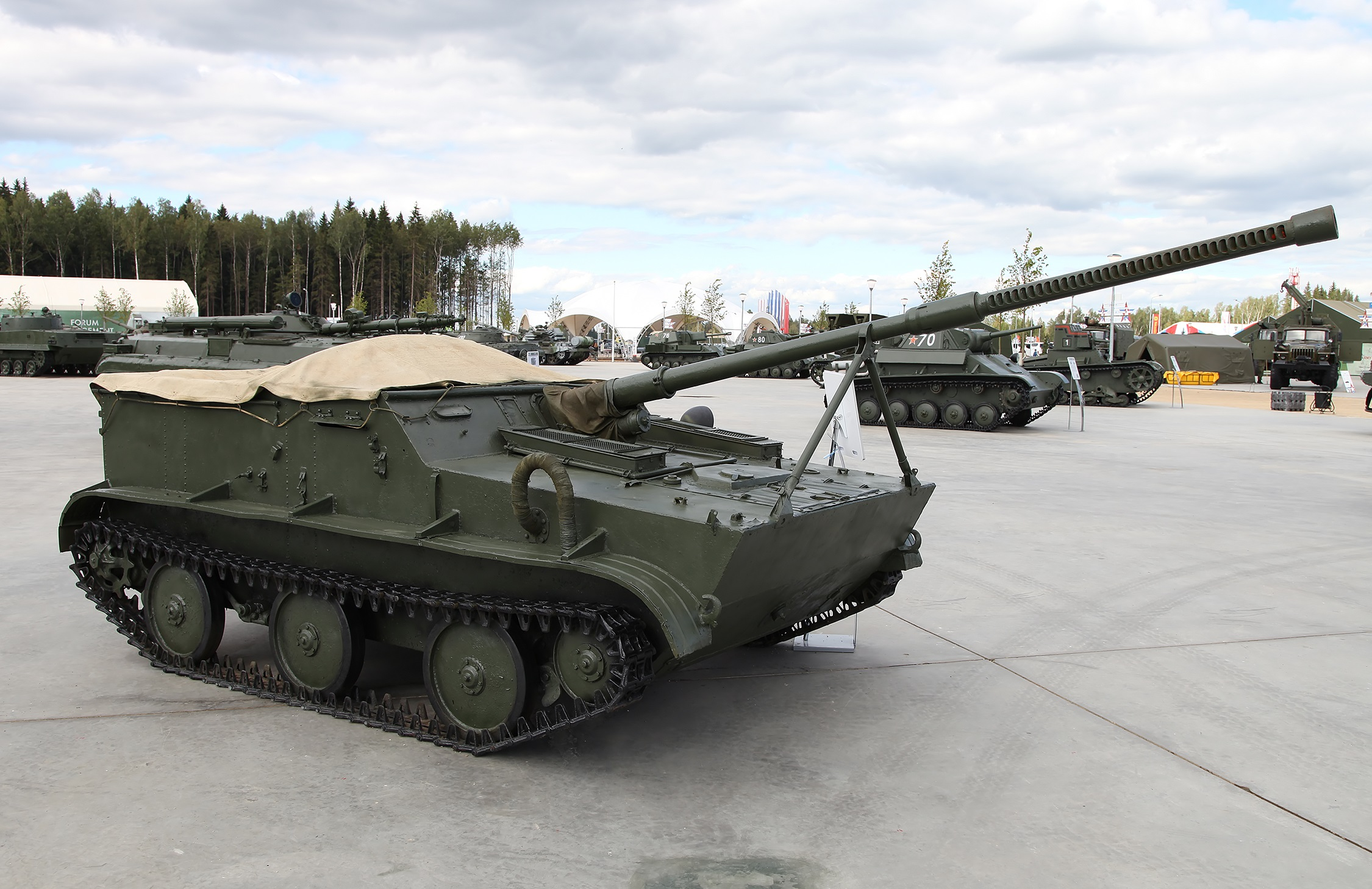
ASU-57P, also known as K-73, in Patriot Park

- ASU-57KShM – An unknown number of ASU-57s were converted into command and staff vehicles (Russian: командно-штабная машина). These had the gun removed and were fitted with additional signals equipment and an extendable canvas tent mounted at the rear.
- BSU-11-57F or 2T2 – Recoilless gun carrier for the B-11 of 107mm. Prototype only.
- ASU-57P or Ob.574 or K-73 – From 1951, work on an amphibious (Russian: плавающая) variant of the ASU-57 started. This version had a re-designed front hull and was armed with a Ch-51P gun with 30 rounds. Even though the five prototypes passed the evaluation with success, series production was never started.

== Operators ==
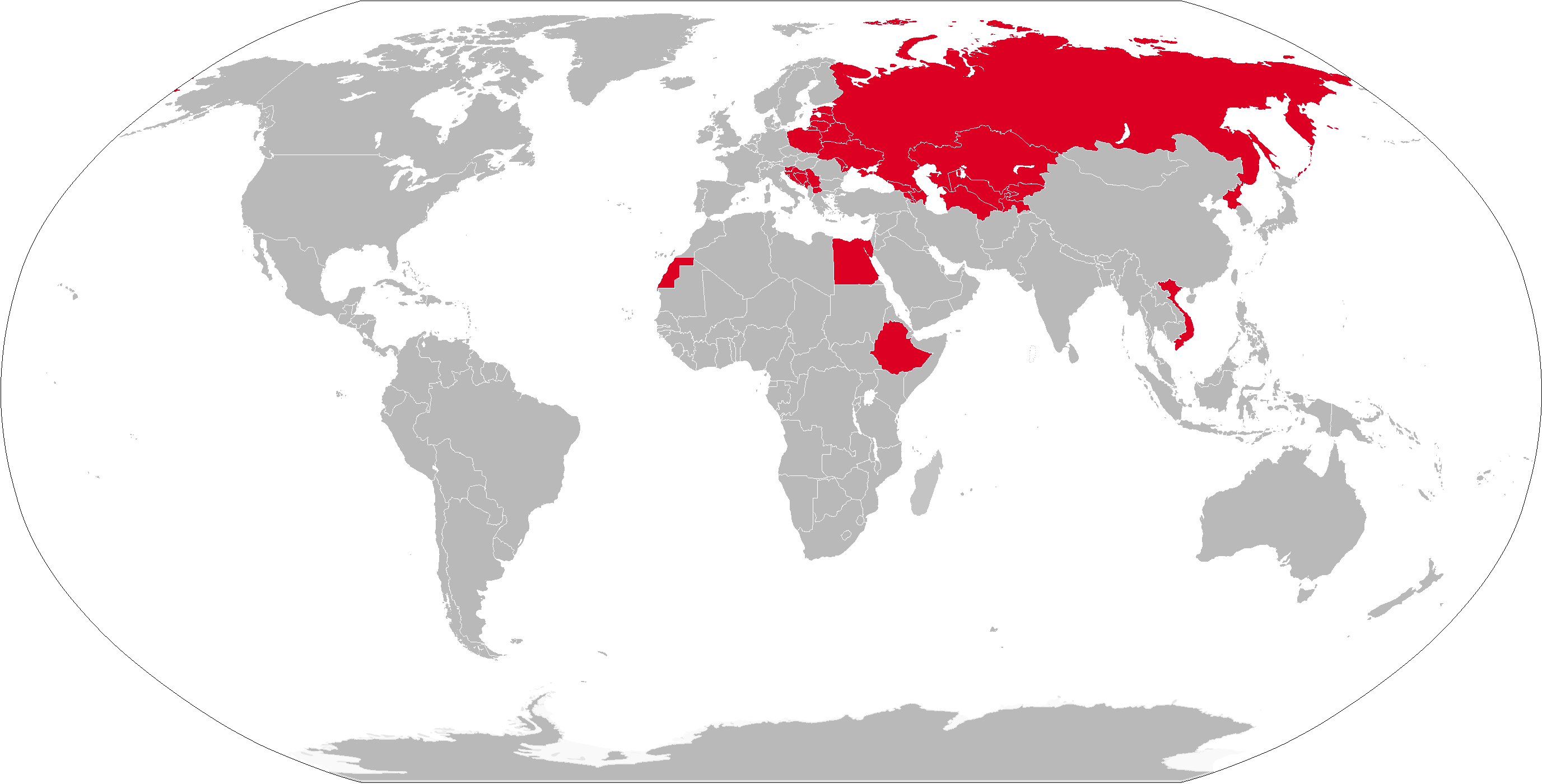
Map of former ASU-57 operators in red

=== Former operators ===
Egypt

- Egyptian Army received a small number of ASU-57s in early 1960s; they were used during Six-Day War in 1967.

Ethiopia

- Ethiopian Army received a few dozen SPGs during the Ogaden War in 1977.

East Germany

- Nationale Volksarmee received 20 former Soviet Army vehicles in 1961–62.

North Korea

- Korean People's Army Ground Force ordered 200 vehicles in 1966. All were previously used by the Soviet Army and were delivered in 1967 and 1968

Sahrawi Republic

- Polisario Front received an unknown number of vehicles from Libya.

Soviet Union

- Soviet Army operated ASU-57s in the airborne divisions of the Soviet Airborne Forces. Reportedly remained in limited use for training as late as 1988.

Vietnam

- Vietnamese People's Army

Yugoslavia

- Yugoslav People's Army
