= Trilux =

German lamp and light fixture company

TRILUX GmbH & Co.KG
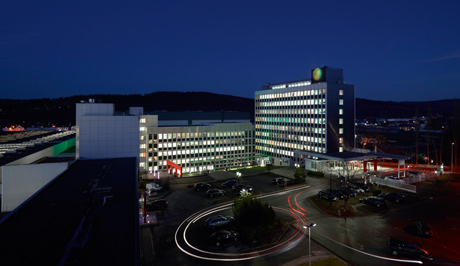
- Industry: lighting technology
- Founded: 1912
- Founder: Wilhelm Lenze
- Headquarters: Arnsberg, Germany
- Key people: Hubertus Volmert, Johannes Huxol, Joachim Geiger
- Number of employees: 5000 (2021)
- Website: www.trilux.com

TRILUX GmbH & Co. KG is a company based in Arnsberg, Germany that develops and produces electric lights and light fixtures.

== About the company ==
The headquarters of the international company are located in Arnsberg, where there are currently 1,500 employees. In addition to the core business the site also houses the electronic components manufacturer BAG Electronics, which is part of the TRILUX Group. Worldwide, the TRILUX Group employs about 5,200 people. The name comes from an early technical innovation where the company developed lights with three times the lumen output of other lights.

== History ==
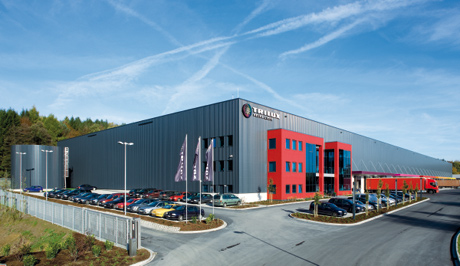
TRILUX EDC Wiebelsheide

The company was founded in 1912 in Menden by Wilhelm Lenze. It originally produced accessories for the lighting industry, and simple tube pendant and wall fixtures for gas and electric lighting. The manufacturing facilities soon reached capacity, so the company moved in 1934 to Arnsberg (then named Hüsten) and extended the building to manufacture residential lighting. At this time, the company had about 50 employees.

During the period of National Socialism Wilhelm Lenze and his son Eberhard had significant problems with the regime. Both were arrested on 20 August 1933 for insulting the national government. Although they were soon released, the local party leadership was critical of the company. In 1944 the government ordered the expropriation and closure of the company for alleged poor performance. Lenze successfully intervened, and this was withdrawn. Bombs destroyed the facility in March 1945.

Full operation was resumed in 1948 by Wilhelm Lenze Eberhard and his sons, Franz and Wilhelm. The company was very successful in the economic boom years, thanks to the production of technical lights for low voltage lamps ("strip lights"). In 1949 the production of incandescent lamps was completely abandoned, and only strip lights remained in the product portfolio. Due to rising demand, production was increased again, and the product range was expanded to include lighting for gas discharge lamps and street lights. In 1952 250 people were employed by the company. It was around this time that TRILUX started to develop into an international business. Building on the early contacts of Wilhelm Lenze, a dense network of commercial agencies in Europe was established.

The number of employees had risen to 750 people by 1962. That year the company's 50th anniversary celebration featured an official speech from Professor Dr. Ludwig Erhard, the then-Federal Minister for Economic Affairs.

In 1963, the company began developing lighting solutions for the medical field. At this time sales increased within ten years from 5 to 35 million DM.

In 1984 TRILUX took over the Swiss company BAG.

Eberhard Lenze died in 1985, leaving one of the three largest manufacturers of professional lighting systems in Europe. In 1987, 75 years after the founding of the company, the TRILUX-light information center was established in the office buildings in Arnsberg. The center included its own auditorium with 100 seats.

Around this time TRILUX expanded its activities into the area of damp-proof technology with the acquisition of the company ZALUX SA based in Zaragoza.

The heirs of the Lenze family moved gradually back from the operational side of the business. In 2006, Michael Huber took over as General Manager. He holds the same position with the company Veltins, a local beer producer.

In the field of retail lighting TRILUX acquired the Köln-based company Oktalite Lighting Technology GmbH in 2007. TRILUX also acquired the exterior illuminating specialists DZ Licht based in Fröndenberg in the same year. At the end of 2008, a portion of Hüco, a manufacturer of electronics components based in Lower Saxony, became part of the TRILUX Group. In the same year the company's European Distribution Center (EDC) was opened in the commercial area heathland Wiebel, Arnsberg.

== Activities ==
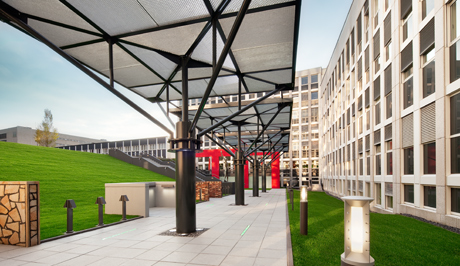
Outdoor facilities of the TRILUX academy

TRILUX products are used worldwide in applications such as:

- Office and administrative buildings
- Schools and universities
- Shopping malls and shops
- Clinics and hospitals
- Airports and stations
- Banks and financial institutions
- Streets, squares, parks and pedestrian zones
- Private living and working areas

== TRILUX Academy ==
The TRILUX Academy was opened on 9 September 2011, and has its headquarters in Arnsberg. It offers seminars, workshops and theme days, delivering practical training to both employees and business associates. Further locations are found in Amersfoort and Mechelen since January 2015 (Trilux Akademie Benelux), Namur, Belgium (since January 2015), Chelmsford, England (since September 2015), Vienna, Austria (since October 2015), Enzheim, France (since June 2017).

== TRILUX international ==
Since 1950s TRILUX Sales subsidiary companies have grown in number. Today TRILUX has offices in Austria, Belgium, Switzerland, Czech Republic, Spain, France, Great Britain, Hungary, Italy, Netherlands, Norway, Poland and Slovakia. In addition TRILUX products and services are distributed by agents in Southeast Asia, the Middle East, the United States, Australia and New Zealand.

== Sponsorships ==
In 2007 TRILUX was one of the main sponsors for the DTM racing series, supported by the Austrian driver Mathias Lauda, son of three-time Formula 1 World Champion Niki Lauda. In the second season in 2009 Ralf Schumacher drove under the logo of Arnsberg in TRILUX's AMG Mercedes C-Class.
