= Project Scorpion =

Project Scorpion is a multinational military modernization program which uses military-run experimentation for acquisition of new armaments. Project Scorpion also tests new military behaviors such as effects-based operations, network-centric warfare, and irregular warfare and civilian-military concepts.

== Origins ==
Originally a U.S. Army concept, Project Scorpion was the new name for the former Intelligent Munitions System (IMS), was re-baptized in its new name around 2004 under the Future Combat System (FCS) framework, this a program which was cancelled in April 2009 by Secretary of Defense Robert Gates; parts of the FCS were swept within the U.S. Army Brigade Combat Team Modernization Program under the U.S. Army Office for Acquisition, Research and Development.

From the outset in 2004, the U.S. Department of Defense promoted Project Scorpion as a means of providing domestic military interoperability, i.e. inter-agency operational facilitation U.S. military bodies such as the Army, Navy, Air Force and Coast Guard. Yet Project Scorpion was also promoted internationally by the U.S. Department of Defense as a means of promoting multinational interoperability for closer U.S. integration with coalition (NATO) militaries. In this light, Project Scorpion was easily adopted by Defense Ministry acquisitions agencies of France, Germany and the United Kingdom; Non-NATO partners appear to have been invited to participate.

As from 2010, it would appear that the United States (DOD) and France (DGA) are the lead-players in the multinational Project Scorpion coalition.

Project Scorpion uses part of the system of systems principles. Such military modernization efforts are part of a wider military concept of Revolution in military affairs, or "RMA". Larger defense companies serving as lead-system integrators for Project Scorpion include Northrop Grumman/EADS, Raytheon/Thales and General Dynamics, SAIC, SAGEM, Lockheed Martin Marietta and Boeing. Budget outlays for Project Scorpion are quite large - ranges of billions of dollars (and Euros) in various countries.

== Project Scorpion as a joint-multinational experiment program ==
Press reports indicate that Project Scorpion was intended for "NATO Interoperability". In this light French, German, U.K and U.S. military descriptions of Project Scorpion are similar, using the same defense companies serve as "lead systems integrators" for the program. Project Scorpion is a facet of the Revolution in Military Affairs modernization program known in the U.S. as Future Combat Systems (FCS), in the UK as Future Rapid Effect System (FRES), in Germany known as Infanterist der Zukunft (IdZ), and in France as FÉLIN, an abbreviation for Fantassin à Équipments et Liaisons Intégrés (Integrated Infantryman Equipment and Communications). All such programs are designed using the "System of Systems" (SOS) military concept philosophy, whereby humans, munitions and "sensors" are jointly used to achieve desired military objectives, these being part of a wider concept under a RMA, or "Revolution in Military Affairs umbrella. None of this nomenclature is especially descriptive or specific in terms of outputs, non-descript nomenclature perhaps being perhaps the hallmark of activities and operations under the Project Scorpion umbrella.

== Project Scorpion in France ==
Project Scorpion is viewed as a new means of practicing procurement by the French military, in the same manner as the controversial Boeing-SAIC Future Combat Systems program, and British Future Rapid Effects program.

Project Scorpion supports the French FÉLIN infantry combat system. France views Project Scorpion as “preparation for future land combat systems, intended to build an armaments program to support [military] transformation,” to be operationalized as a “system of contact for versatile capabilities and information networking,”.

On 22 February 2010, France launched an "investigation phase" of Project Scorpion under the aegis of a special military investment committee (Comité ministériel des investissements) composed of the French Minister of Defense, the French Joint Chiefs of Staff and the French arms acquisition authority (Directorate General for Armaments). France has put forth Project Scorpion as a "multinational project"

== Project Scorpion in the United States ==
=== Project Scorpion and U.S. Coast Guard Intelligence ===
In his May 2006 confirmation hearing before the Senate Committee on Commerce, Science and Transportation, U.S. Coast Guard Commandant Thad Allen described Project Scorpion as "an archetypal national-level collaborative partnership with DHS, DOJ, and DOD counterparts under Coast Guard leadership to identify, track and intercept special interest aliens with possible terrorist or affiliate ties before they arrive in the U.S. via maritime means.". As well as being a tool for 'intercepting persons deemed as threats' outside the United States, Admiral Allen noted the importance of Project Scorpion as part of the wider U.S. Coast Guard Maritime Domain Awareness (MDA), pursuing the acquisition of data on the global environment which may have bearing on threats and vulnerabilities to U.S. ports.

=== Project Scorpion probable name for U.S. Coast Guard Deployable Operations Group (DOG) ===
In 2007, U.S. Coast Guard Deployable Operations Group (DOG) commenced with management of a single command authority to rapidly provide the Coast Guard, DHS, DoD, DoJ and other interagency operational commanders adaptive force packages drawn from the U.S. Coast Guard's deployable specialized force units. An MOU was signed between the Department of the Navy (DON) and U.S. Special Operations Forces (SOF) bringing the U.S. Coast Guard into the world of special operations and tactical command. It appears likely that the USCG DOG is the implementation of Project Scorpion.

=== Project Scorpion and U.S. Army Acquisitions, Research and Development ===
That Project Scorpion was used as an operational tool for moral combat against human beings. The program was approved for qualification testing in spring of 2010. The U.S. Army Research Laboratory Survivability Lethality Analysis Directorate lauded and awarded the project as an achieved "mobility kill". In "engagements against an approved threat target" claimed that Project Scorpion was useful in urban (civilian) as well as active war domains.

== See also ==
- Future Combat Systems
- USCG Deployable Operations Group (DOG)
- Network-centric warfare
- Asymmetric warfare
- Urban warfare
- Joint Unconventional Warfare
- Deniable warfare
- Maritime Domain Awareness
- Global Maritime Situational Awareness
- Intelligent Munitions System

== Government ==
- Programme Scorpion (France) French military acquisitions authority (DGA) - Official webpage
- French military acquisitions programs run under Programme Scorpion - official webpage
- NDIA 2009 Munitions Executive Summit
- U.S. Naval acquisition authority for Project Scorpion (DTIC)
