= Fox 7 =

Fox 7 may refer to:

== Television stations in the United States affiliated with Fox ==
=== Current affiliates ===
- KAII-TV in Wailuku, Hawaii
  - Satellite of KHON-TV in Honolulu, Hawaii
- KEVN-LD in Rapid City, South Dakota
- KPPI-LD2 in Saipan, Northern Mariana Islands
  - Satellite of KTGM in Tamuning, Guam
- KQCD-DT2, a digital channel of KQCD-TV in Dickinson, North Dakota
- KRCR-DT2, a digital channel of KRCR-TV in Redding, California
- KTBC in Austin, Texas (O&O)
- WSVN in Miami–Fort Lauderdale, Florida

=== Formerly affiliated ===
- K07UU/KFXF in Fairbanks, Alaska (1992–2017)
- KBZK in Bozeman, Montana (1996–2000)
  - Was a satellite of KXLF-TV in Butte, Montana
- KTTW in Sioux Falls, South Dakota (2009–2020)
- WTVW in Evansville, Indiana (1995–2011)
- WTRF-DT2 in Wheeling, West Virginia (2007–2014)

== Other uses ==
- FOX-7 (1,1-diamino-2,2-dinitroethene [DADNE]), an insensitive high explosive compound
