= High-Explosive Shell =

Type of artillery shell

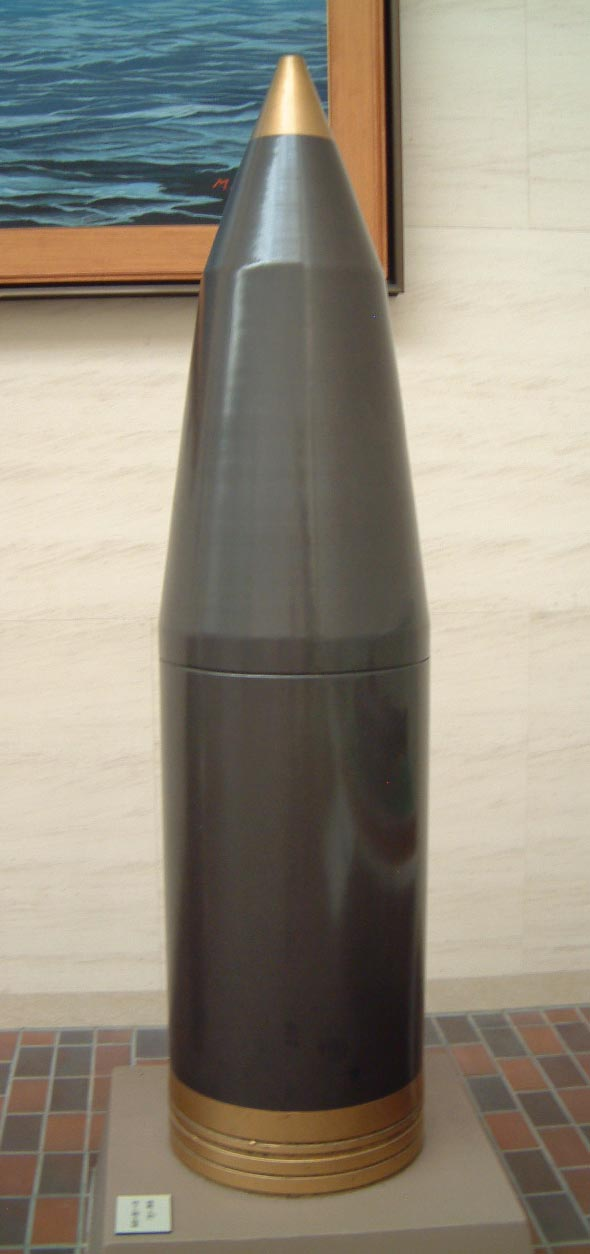
- A Japanese type 0 high-explosive shell, as fired by the battleship Yamato
- Type: Artillery shell
- Place of origin: Venetian Army in Jadra, 1376

Service history
- In service: 1376–

High-explosive (HE) shells are a type of artillery shell that explodes upon contact, or before contact, depending on the fuze, with a target, shattering the metal casing into shrapnel. They are the most common type of artillery shell, being used by almost all militaries worldwide due to their versatility, ease of production, and effectiveness. In most modern wars, they have been responsible for the majority of casualties to their shrapnel spray upon explosion.

They have historically contained either trinitrotoluene or Composition B, due to their low melting point and shock resistance, paired with their high brisance. Recently, more stable and explosive formulae, such as IMX-101 and IMX-104, have been used. The outer casing is usually made of steel or cast-iron, and is designed to be destroyed and become shrapnel when the shell explodes.

Since the Second World War, they have been the most widely used kind of shell. They were used during the First World War, especially on the Western Front, to destroy troop positions, but shrapnel shells were favored. It was not until the Second World War that HE shells became the most used kind of shell due to the wider range of movement during the war and the increased chances for shelter.

The largest user and producer of HE shells worldwide is Russia, who manufactures 300% the amount manufactured by the US and the EU combined. They are also the largest user of HE shells, expending 10,000 to 27,000 artillery rounds every day in Ukraine. The US is the largest exporter of HE shells, manufacturing and exporting around 42% of the world's artillery shell supplies.

== History ==
The earliest recorded use of HE shells was in 1376, when the Republic of Venice used them against the Genoese in Jadra. These were primitive explosive, consisting of two bronze or stone half-spheres joined with hoops and exploded with a powder fuse. They were standard usage for mortars after the mid-16th century, when they became more sophisticated, consisting of iron balls filled with black powder which would explode upon collision.

During the 18th century, much progress was made towards modernizing artillery shells. They became more consistently spherical, and thicker at the base, so that the fuse-hole at the front of the shell would be less likely to be extinguished. However, cannons were still largely smooth, inaccurate, and unrifled, and the balls were still mostly spherical.

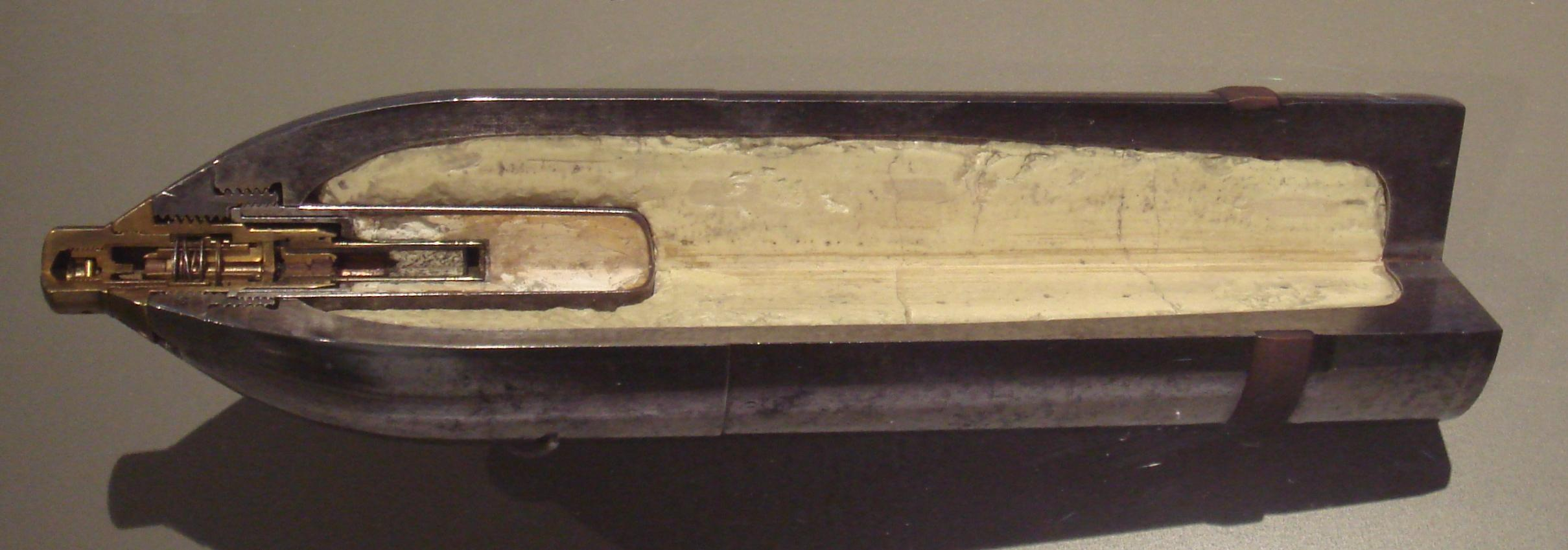
A picric acid artillery shell from 1896

The late 19th century and the Crimean War brought about another revolution towards the development of HE shells. Before then, artillery shells had largely been made of iron, but the commercialization of steel made that the new most common building material. With this, rifling was largely introduced in artillery, which would spin the shell, improving range and accuracy. New explosive were implemented in the shells themselves, with new smokeless powders such as cordite, Poudre B and picric acid. These were more explosive and damaging than the earlier black powder and stabler in flight. However, these new explosives required moving the lighting fuse to the back of the shell to retain consistency in lighting. At this point, only around 10% of the weight of the shell was made up of the actual explosives.

It was around this time that shells gained their modern streamlined appearance. These are more aerodynamic then cannonballs, and are more effective for armor piercing, which was vital due to the implementation of the first armored ships during the American Civil War.

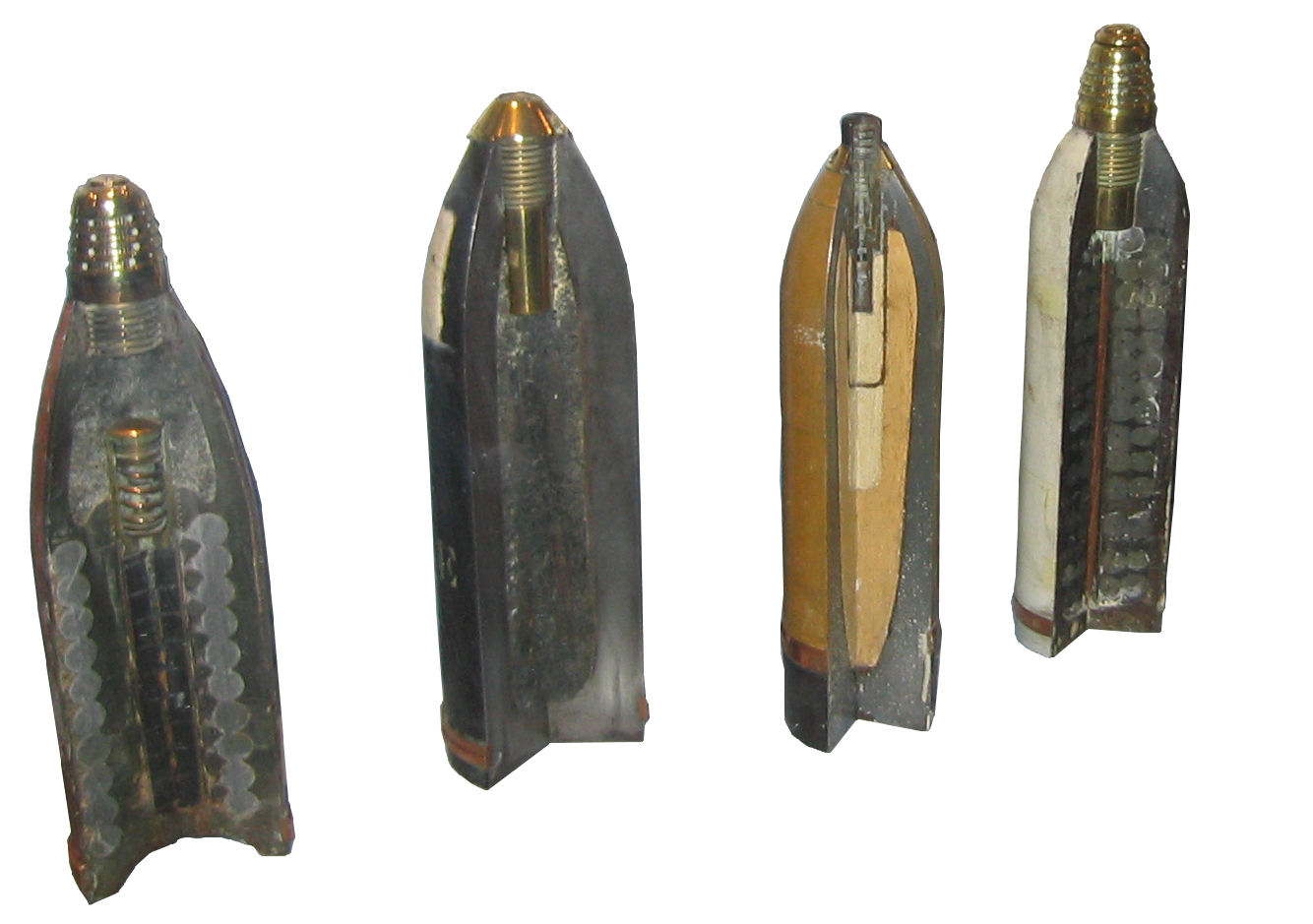
4 French artillery shells from the First World War

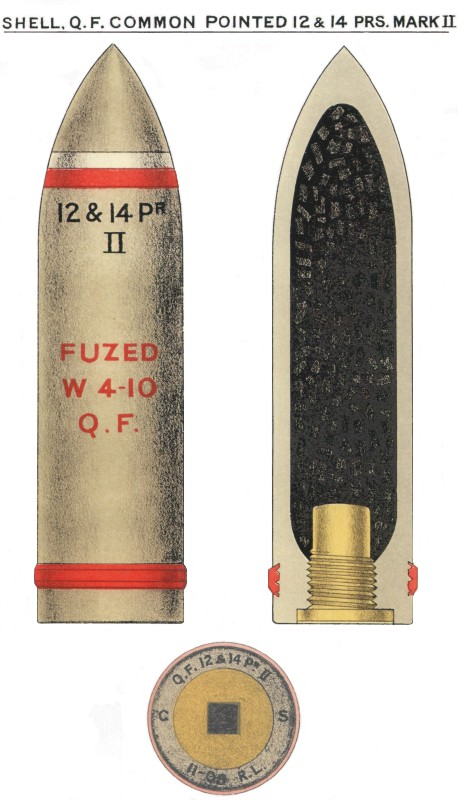
A shell from the First World War containing gunpowder

The First World War brought further developments to shells. Shrapnel shells, shells designed to spread shrapnel over a large area of ground, were used more commonly during the First World War, due to the largely still, entrenched positions of soldiers throughout the conflict. However, one of the main aspects of trench warfare during the war, the launch of shells at opposing sides preluding an infantry assault, utilized HE shells. During the war, Armies largely moved away from using powder to using trinitrotoluene (TNT) to increase damage against fortifications. In 1916, the first instantaneous artillery fuzes, such as the British no. 106 fuze, were introduced, alongside further improvements to shell casings.

The Second World War utilized HE shells to further effect then the First, due to the wider range of movement and increased urban warfare. Around 80% of artillery shells fired during the war were HE shells. High-explosive squash head (HESH) shells were especially used, due to their effectiveness against armor and concrete positions. HESH shells contain plastic explosive that activates upon impact and a second explosive charge that activates milliseconds later, creating a shock wave that is effective for destroying concrete. The first variable time (VT) fuzes were implemented during the war, allowing shells to be remotely activated before making contact with a target, increasing effectiveness against ground troops. Another advancement made was mingenschoß, or Mine shells. They had far thinner exterior shell walls then standard HE shells, allowing for a much higher explosive content and pressure wave against any fortifications they hit. The exterior walls can be so thin that, at times, the interior caliber can be as little as 1/16 standard ones. During the Second World War, the leading designs for HE shells increased to 15% from the First World War. However, 25% was deemed ideal for anti-personnel shells.

During the 1950s and 1960s, the percentage of a shell's weight made up of explosives rose further, and 25% became the standard. However, to hold this much explosive material, the exterior walls of the shells had to be reduced even further. This was achieved by the British and German FH-70 program, who replaced standard shell casings with a high tensile steel, which is stronger then the previously used standard. Later, electronic time fuzes were first introduced for artillery shells, which allowed for higher accuracy and easier testing. HISH shells were perfecting in the early 1950s.

== Composition ==
A modern HE shell is made up of the casing, usually made of carbon steel, a propelling charge at the base of the shell, and an explosive charge. The explosive charge is usually made of Intensive Munitions Explosives (IMX), which resist shocks and explosions better than TNT or Composition B, such as IMX-101 or IMX-104. They have the added benefit of being less likely to explode in transit, therefore being safer.

Propelling charges are used to launch a shell from the barrel of the artillery piece to its target. The type of propellant depends on the caliber and range of the shell, but the standard is a white-bag propellant, such as M4A2. Red-bag propellants are generally used for extended range in artillery shells, such as M119A2.

== Types ==
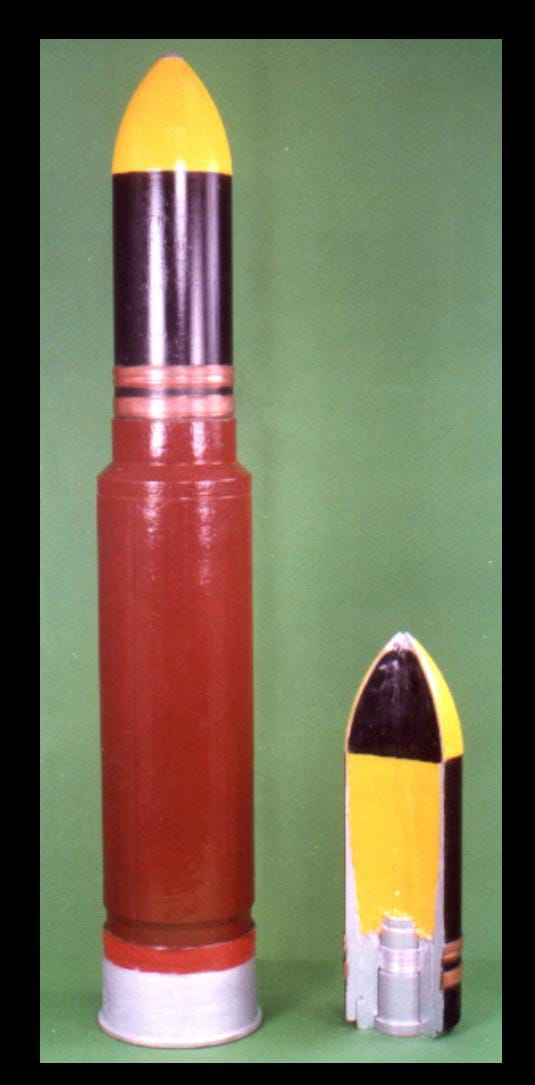
Cross-section of a high-explosive squash head shell

As high-explosive shells are the most common type of artillery shell, there are several specialized types of HE shells for more specific purposes.

=== High-explosive incendiary ===
High-explosive incendiary (HEI) shells are a type of HE shell that contains an incendiary rounds alongside the explosive round.

=== High-explosive squash head ===
High-explosive squash head (HESH) shells are HE shells that utilize a plastic explosive head that conforms to the shape of its target, increasing explosive transfer between the target and the shell. They utilize a delayed fuze that will activate once the plastic explosive has conformed to the shape of the target. They are mainly utilized against armored units, as the explosive and the shockwave it causes can be incredibly effective against tanks and armor. They were first utilized during the Second World War, when they were designed to be used by concrete fortifications.

=== High-explosive anti-tank ===
Despite the name, high-explosive anti-tank (HEAT) shells are not types of HE shells. Instead, they utilize explosives to collapse an internal steel liner creating a high-velocity jet, which uses the Monroe Effect to do damage to tanks and other armored units. They can deal damage through armor with thickness equal to seven times the shell's diameter. The actual damage is entirely dealt by kinetic energy, and the explosives do no damage to the target.
