= FCS/BCT unmanned aerial vehicles =

FCS/BCT unmanned aerial vehicles were several unmanned aerial vehicles developed under the jurisdiction of the Future Combat Systems (FCS) program until it was dissolved and succeeded by the BCT Modernization program.

The Class II and Class III UAVs were canceled in May 2007. The XM157 UAV was canceled when FCS was dissolved in June 2009. The final aircraft, the XM156, was canceled in February 2010, when the E-IBCT component of the BCT Modernization program was dissolved.

== Vehicles ==
=== XM156 Class I ===
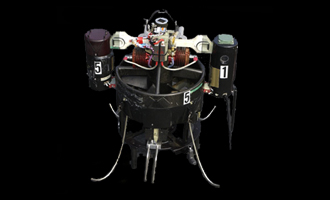
XM156 Class I UAS

The XM156 Class I was a platoon level asset that provided the dismounted soldier with reconnaissance, surveillance, and target acquisition (RSTA) and laser designation. Total system weight, which included the air vehicle, a control device, and ground support equipment is less than 51 pounds (23 kg) and was light enough to be carried by an individual soldier.

This micro air vehicle operated in open, rolling, complex and urban terrains with a vertical take-off and landing capability. It was interoperable with select ground and air platforms and controlled by mounted or dismounted soldiers. The Class I used autonomous flight and navigation, but could interact with the network and Soldier to dynamically update routes and target information. It provides dedicated reconnaissance support and early warning to the smallest echelons of the Brigade Combat Team (BCT) in environments not suited to larger assets.

The Class I system provided a hover and stare capability that is not currently available in the Army UAV inventory for urban and route surveillance. The Class I system also filled known gaps that exist in force operations, such as: Protect Force in Counterinsurgency (COIN) Operations, Soldier Protection in COIN environment, Ability to Conduct Joint Urban Operations, Enhanced ISR/RSTA Capabilities, Hover and Stare operations.

The Class I UAS was part of Spin Out 1 and entered evaluation by Soldiers at the Army Evaluation Task Force (AETF). It would have been fielded to Infantry Brigade Combat Teams (IBCT) starting in 2011.

=== Class II and Class III ===
In a December 2006 memo assistant acquisition secretary Claude Bolton directed FCS to end work on the Class II and III UAVs.

XM157 Class II UAV

Class II

The Class II UAV would have supported the Infantry and Mounted Combat System Company Commanders with reconnaissance, security/early warning, target and designation.

The Class II had twice the endurance and a wider range of capabilities than the Class I. It was a multifunctional aerial system possessing a Vertical Take-Off and Landing capability. The Class II Unmanned Aerial Vehicle (UAV) would be a vehicle-mounted system that provided Line-of-Sight enhanced dedicated imagery. The distinguishing capability of this UAV is target designation in all conditions. This provides the ability to direct Line-of-Sight (LOS), Beyond-Line-of-Sight (BLOS), and Non-Line-of-Sight (NLOS) fires. It could team with selected ground and air platforms, and provides limited communications relay. The Class II could be carried by two Soldiers. It had a 16 km radius of action, and can remain aloft for two hours.

This section incorporates work from https://web.archive.org/web/20070314013051/http://www.army.mil/fcs/factfiles/uav2.html, which is in the public domain as it is a work of the United States Military.

Class III

XM157 Class III UAV

The Class III UAV was a fixed-wing multifunction aerial system that has the range and endurance to support battalion level RSTA within the Modular Force's (UA) battle space.

It provides the capabilities of the Class I and Class II, but also provides communications relay, mine detection, Chemical, Biological, Radiological and Nuclear (CBRN) detection, and meteorological survey. The Class III Unmanned Aerial Vehicle (UAV) has a six-hour endurance and a 40 km radius of action. It allows the Non-Line-of-Sight (NLOS) battalion to deliver precision fires within the UA area of interest. The Class III must be able to take-off and land without a dedicated air field.

This section incorporates work from https://web.archive.org/web/20070314012900/http://www.army.mil/fcs/factfiles/uav3.html, which is in the public domain as it is a work of the United States Military.

=== XM157 Class IV ===
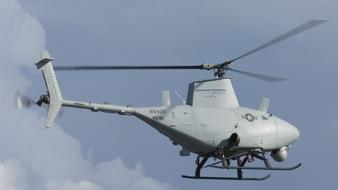
XM157 Class IV UAV

The XM157 Class IV UAV, was intended to provide reconnaissance, aerial communications extension capability at the brigade level for the United States Army's Future Combat Systems program. Other missions were to include land mine and improvised explosive device detection, standoff chemical, biological and radiological detection, and electronic intelligence collection. It was to be organic to the reconnaissance, surveillance, and target acquisition squadron within the FCS brigade combat team, which will consist of troops of manned armed reconnaissance helicopters (ARH) and a separate troop of Class IV UAVs. The FCS Class IV UAV Program was cancelled in January 2010.

==== Development ====
The XM157 is derived from the Navy-Marine MQ-8 Fire Scout which was derived from the manned Schweizer S-333. The Army was evaluating a land-based version of the system for fielding of the aircraft to brigade combat teams. The XM157 was produced, in developmental stages, by Northrop Grumman. After cancellation of Future Combat Systems in early 2009, the aircraft was transferred to BCT Modernization. The aircraft was supposed to be fielded in 2014. In December 2010, The U.S. Army suspended its version of the Class IV UAV. The army believes that the fixed-wing and unmanned RQ-7 Shadow can meet future Army requirements with product improvements.

==== Design ====
The Block III AH-64D Apache attack helicopter would have had the capability to control Class IV UAVs from the cockpit, receive their imagery products, and exploit their remote laser designation capability. This manned-unmanned teaming capability will also be available on later models of the ARH.

The system (composed of 4 air vehicles and associated Humvee-based ground control and automated launch and recovery systems), was required to operate continuously for 18–24 hours over a 75 kilometres (47 mi) radius. Each is capable of 8 hours continuous flight and a payload of 130 pounds (59 kg).

== History ==
The Class II and Class III UAVs were canceled in May 2007. The XM157 UAV was canceled when Future Combat Systems was dissolved in June 2009. The final aircraft, the XM156, was canceled in February 2010 when the E-IBCT component of the BCT Modernization program was dissolved.
