= Nitrotriazolone =

Names
- Preferred IUPAC name 5-nitro-1,2-dihydro-3H-1,2,4-triazol-3-one

Identifiers
CAS Number	932-64-9
3D model (JSmol)	Interactive image
Abbreviations	NTO
ChemSpider	2696109
ECHA InfoCard	100.012.050
EC Number	213-254-4
MeSH	C420648
PubChem CID	3453883
UNII	43WPQ5QCE3
UN number	0490
CompTox Dashboard (EPA)	DTXSID80883616
- InChI: InChI=1S/C2H2N4O3/c7-2-3-1(4-5-2)6(8)9/h(H2,3,4,5,7) Key: QJTIRVUEVSKJTK-UHFFFAOYSA-N
- SMILES: C1(=NC(=O)NN1)[N+](=O)[O-]

Properties
Chemical formula	C_{2}H_{2}N_{4}O_{3}
Molar mass	130.063 g·mol^{−1}
Appearance	Off white, yellowish beige color to light yellow powder, crystals, or prills
Odor	Odourless
Density	1.9 g/cm^{3} (20 °C)
Melting point	268–271 °C (514–520 °F; 541–544 K)
Solubility in water	17,200 mg/L
Solubility	Soluble in acetone, ethyl acetate Slightly soluble in dichloromethane
log P	−1.699 (22 °C)
Acidity (pK_{a})	3.76 (20 °C)

Explosive data
Shock sensitivity	Very low
Friction sensitivity	Very low
Detonation velocity	8,500 m/s

Thermochemistry
Heat capacity (C)	124.5 J/K at (47 °C)
Std enthalpy of combustion (Δ_{c}H^{⦵}_{298})	−934.4 kJ/mol

Hazards
- GHS labelling
Pictograms	(GHS01: Explosive) (GHS02: Flammable) (GHS07: Exclamation mark) (GHS08: Health hazard)
Signal word	Danger
Hazard statements	H209, H223, H242, H301, H313, H315, H319, H333, H335
Precautionary statements	P210, P220, P260, P262, P270, P280
- Except where otherwise noted, data are given for materials in their standard state (at 25 °C [77 °F], 100 kPa). Infobox references

Nitrotriazolone (NTO) is a cyclic semicarbazide-derived high explosive first identified in 1905, but not thoroughly researched until the 1980s. NTO is currently being used by the US Army in specialty insensitive munitions.

Nitrotriazolone is getting progressively adopted in novel explosive formulations, such as IMX-101, a new, safer alternative to TNT specially devised in 2010 by BAE Systems, where it is combined with 2,4-dinitroanisole (DNAN) and nitroguanidine. As such, NTO is found in the vast majority of IMX formulations. The Picatinny Arsenal has also adopted the implementation of NTO and DNAN in many of their likewise newly developed insensitive explosive mixtures, which share many of the same applications of the IMXs.

== Properties ==
Nitrotriazolone shows keto–enol tautomerism through proton transfer reactions. The keto form shows significantly different stability to heat, friction, and impact.

Nitrotriazolone can form either a mono- or dihydrate.

== Preparation ==
NTO was first made in 1905 in a two step process. Semicarbazide hydrochloride is condensed with formic acid to produce 1,2,4-triazol-3-one, which is nitrated with nitric acid to form nitrotriazolone.

== Toxicity ==
In vivo studies showed the nitrotriazolone is absorbed through the skin and gastrointestinal tract. In the kidneys, NTO is broken down into 5-amino-1,2,4-triazol-3-one, which undergoes oxidative denitrification and forms urazoles and nitrites in rats.
