= FOX-7 =

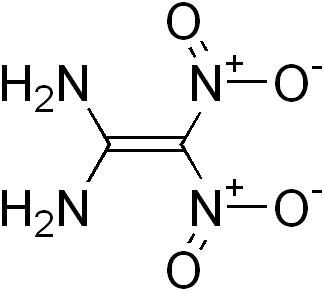

Names
- Preferred IUPAC name 2,2-Dinitroethene-1,1-diamine
- Other names FOX-7; FOX7

Identifiers
CAS Number	145250-81-3
3D model (JSmol)	Interactive image
ChemSpider	467536
ECHA InfoCard	100.130.630
EC Number	604-466-1
PubChem CID	536770
UNII	3B2KYV7C3F
CompTox Dashboard (EPA)	DTXSID70894014
- InChI: InChI=1S/C2H4N4O4/c3-1(4)2(5(7)8)6(9)10/h3-4H2 Key: FUHQFAMVYDIUKL-UHFFFAOYSA-N
- SMILES: N/C(N)=C([N+]([O-])=O)\[N+]([O-])=O

Properties
Chemical formula	C_{2}H_{4}N_{4}O_{4}
Molar mass	148.08
Appearance	Bright yellow crystalline powder
Density	1.885 g cm^{−3}
Melting point	238 °C (460 °F; 511 K) (decomposes)
Solubility in water	Soluble in polar aprotic solvents such as dimethyl sulfoxide (DMSO), N,N-Dimethylformamide (DMF), and N-Methyl-2-pyrrolidone (NMP)

Hazards
- GHS labelling
Pictograms	(GHS01: Explosive) (GHS02: Flammable) (GHS07: Exclamation mark)
Signal word	Danger
Hazard statements	H201, H228, H302
Precautionary statements	P210, P230, P240, P241, P250, P264, P270, P280, P301+P312, P330, P370+P378, P370+P380, P372, P373, P401, P501

Explosive data
Friction sensitivity	>350N
Detonation velocity	8870 m/s at density 1.885 g cm^{−3} (estimated); 8335 m/s at density 1.756 g cm^{−3} (measured, small-scale testing)
- Except where otherwise noted, data are given for materials in their standard state (at 25 °C [77 °F], 100 kPa). verify (what is ?) Infobox references

FOX-7 or 1,1-diamino-2,2-dinitroethylene (DADNE) is an insensitive high explosive compound. It was first synthesized in 1998 by the Swedish National Defence Research Institute. According to other information it was synthesized in the USSR in 1990. The name FOX-7 is derived from the acronym of the Swedish Defence Research Agency (FOI), with the I replaced by an X to indicate an explosive, as in RDX and HMX.

FOX-7 is similar to the insensitive chemical compound TATB, which is a benzene ring compound with three amino and three nitro groups. FOX-7 has a two-carbon backbone rather than a benzene ring, but the amino and nitro groups have similar effects in both cases according to published reports on the sensitivity and chemical decay processes of FOX-7. FOX-7 is stoichiometrically identical (but structurally unrelated) to the explosives and propellants RDX and HMX, and therefore produces the same quantity of gas per gram, a key determinant of performance.

By various measures, such as dropped-weight impact, friction force, temperature of ignition, and response to heating under confinement, it is less sensitive than the benchmark explosive RDX, while having performance slightly greater than the same. Its explosive properties appear extremely favorable; in addition to its insensitive properties, the detonation velocity of mixtures of 80% FOX-7 plus binders is as high as Composition B, and nearly pure FOX-7 based plastic bonded explosives are slightly superior to RDX. FOX-7 has been calculated to have a detonation velocity of 8,870 m/s. Charges composed of EVA-coated FOX-7 granules pressed into pellets of 92% theoretical maximum density were found to have a detonation velocity of 7730 m/s, compared to 7630 m/s for a similar RDX/EVA composition, and 5% greater detonation pressure.

FOX-7 is produced as of 2018 by EURENCO Bofors AB of Sweden, having been made in batches up to 7 kg in 2001. In laboratory-scale synthesis, material costs were calculated at ~AU$3000/kg (prices in 2002 AUD) using prices from research chemical suppliers. At that time, FOX-7 could be purchased from NEXPLO Bofors AB at SEK3200/kg. Due to its small-scale production, the cost of FOX-7 is relatively high. However, the production is based on commercial starting material and the synthesis is uncomplicated.

FOX-7 is an attractive subject for research and development due to its combination of insensitivity and power. FOX-7 performs similarly to RDX, unlike other insensitive high explosives under investigation, such as TATB, nitrotriazolone, TEX, and 2,6-diamino-3,5-dinitropyrazine-1-oxide (LLM-105). Due to the need for less sensitive munitions, FOX-7 is being investigated at many military research centers, including in Australia, India, the USA, and Sweden.

Fox-7 is synthesized by nitration of 4,6-dihydroxy-2-methylpyrimidine to 2-dinitromethylene-5,5-dinitropyrimidine-4,6-dione, which is then hydrolyzed for Fox-7. The precursor is itself synthesized via reaction of acetamidine hydrochloride with a malonic acid ester.
