= TATB =

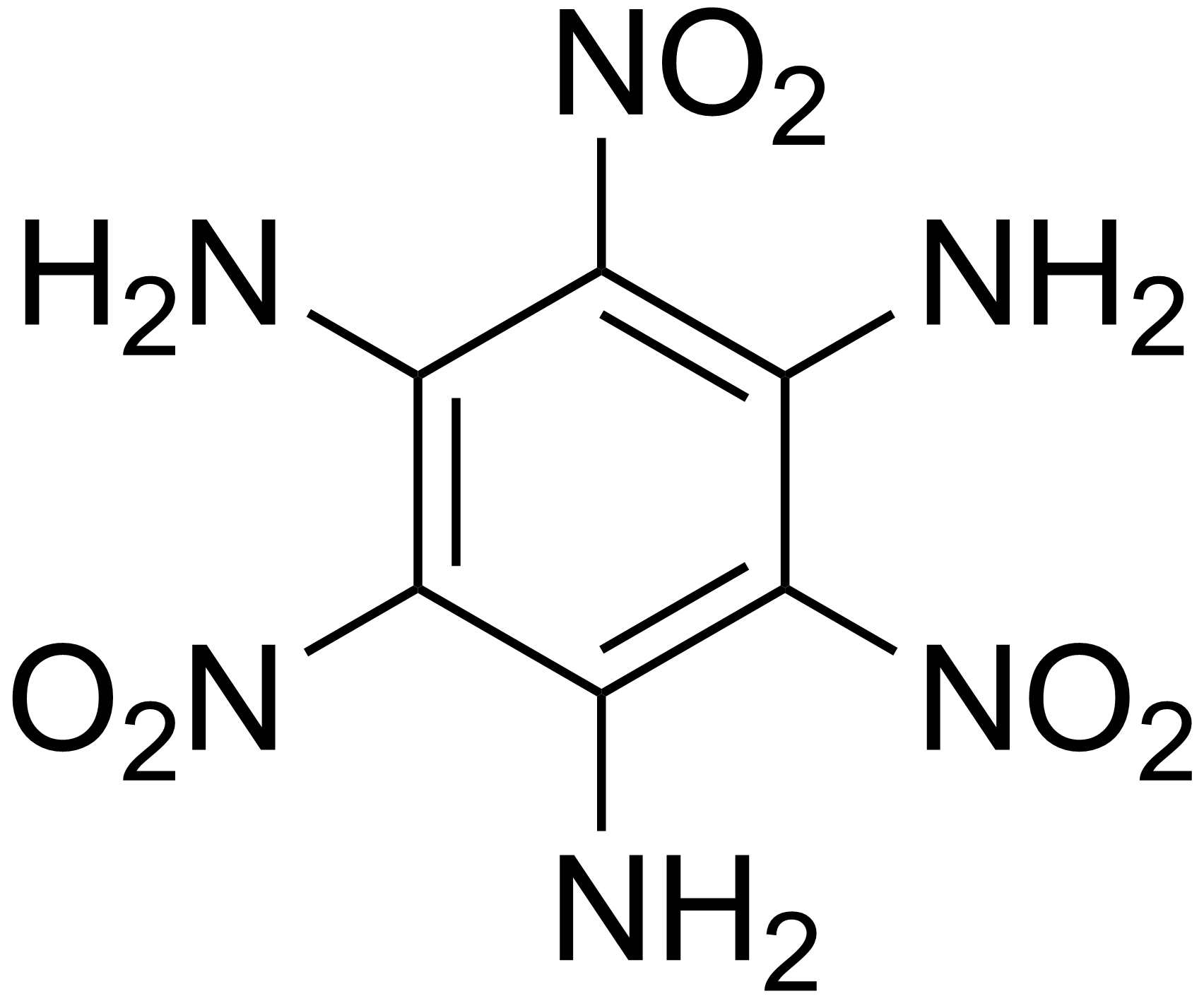

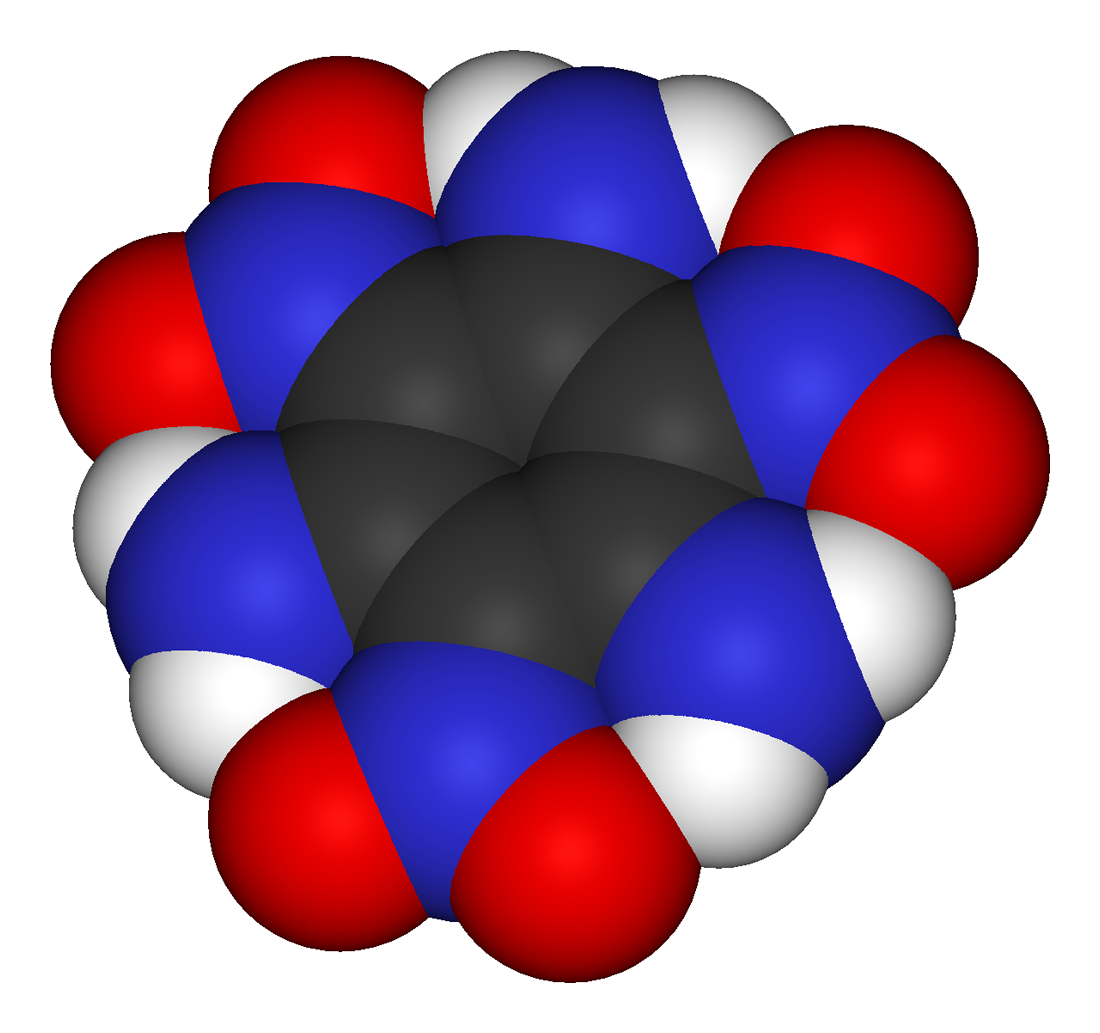

Names
- Preferred IUPAC name 2,4,6-Trinitrobenzene-1,3,5-triamine

Identifiers
| CAS Number | 3058-38-6 |
| 3D model (JSmol) | Interactive image |
| ChemSpider | 17272 |
| ECHA InfoCard | 100.019.362 |
| PubChem CID | 18286 |
| UNII | CJP3UNX7Z7 |
| CompTox Dashboard (EPA) | DTXSID8062818 |
- InChI: InChI=1S/C6H6N6O6/c7-1-4(10(13)14)2(8)6(12(17)18)3(9)5(1)11(15)16/h7-9H2 Key: JDFUJAMTCCQARF-UHFFFAOYSA-N; InChI=1/C6H6N6O6/c7-1-4(10(13)14)2(8)6(12(17)18)3(9)5(1)11(15)16/h7-9H2 Key: JDFUJAMTCCQARF-UHFFFAOYAO
- SMILES: c1(c(c(c(c(c1[N+](=O)[O-])N)[N+](=O)[O-])N)[N+](=O)[O-])N

Properties
| Chemical formula | C_{6}H_{6}N_{6}O_{6} |
| Molar mass | 258.15 g/mol |
| Appearance | Yellow or brown powdered crystals (rhombohedral) |
| Density | 1.93 g/cm^{3} |
| Melting point | 350 °C (662 °F; 623 K) |

Explosive data
| Shock sensitivity | Insensitive |
| Friction sensitivity | Insensitive |
| Detonation velocity | 7350 m/s (at 1.80 g/cm^{3}) |
- Except where otherwise noted, data are given for materials in their standard state (at 25 °C [77 °F], 100 kPa). verify (what is ?) Infobox references

TATB, triaminotrinitrobenzene or 2,4,6-triamino-1,3,5-trinitrobenzene is an aromatic secondary explosive, based on the basic six-carbon benzene ring structure with three nitro functional groups (NO_{2}) and three amine (NH_{2}) groups attached, alternating around the ring.

TATB is a very powerful explosive (somewhat less powerful than RDX, but more than TNT), but it is extremely insensitive to shock, vibration, fire, or impact. Because it is so difficult to detonate by accident, even under severe conditions, it has become preferred for applications where extreme safety is required, such as the explosives used in nuclear weapons, where accidental detonation during an airplane crash or rocket misfiring could potentially detonate the fissile core. All British nuclear warheads use TATB-based explosives in their primary stage. According to David Albright, South Africa's nuclear weapons used TATB to increase their safety.

TATB is normally used as the explosive ingredient in plastic bonded explosive compositions, such as PBX-9502, LX-17-0, and PBX-9503 (with 15% HMX). These formulations are described as insensitive high explosives (IHEs) in nuclear weapons literature.

Though it could theoretically be mixed with other explosive compounds in castable mixtures or other use forms, the applications for such forms would be unclear since they would largely undo the insensitivity of pure TATB.

== Properties ==
At a pressed density of 1.80, TATB has a velocity of detonation of 7,350 meters per second.

TATB has a crystal density of 1.93 grams/cm^{3}, though most forms currently in use have no higher density than 1.80 grams/cm^{3}. TATB melts at 350 °C. The chemical formula for TATB is C_{6}(NO_{2})_{3}(NH_{2})_{3}.

Pure TATB has a bright yellow color.

TATB has been found to remain stable at temperatures at least as high as 250 °C for prolonged periods of time.

== Production ==
TATB is produced by nitration of 1,3,5-trichlorobenzene to 1,3,5-trichloro-2,4,6-trinitrobenzene, then the chlorine atoms are substituted with amine groups using ammonolysis.

However, it is likely that the production of TATB will be switched over to a process involving the nitration and transamination of phloroglucinol, since this process is milder, cheaper, and reduces the amount of ammonium chloride salt produced in waste effluents (greener).

Still, another process has been found for the production of TATB from materials that are surplus to military use. 1,1,1-trimethylhydrazinium iodide (TMHI) is formed from the rocket fuel unsymmetrical dimethylhydrazine (UDMH) and methyl iodide, and acts as a vicarious nucleophilic substitution (VNS) amination reagent. When picramide, which is easily produced from Explosive D, is reacted with TMHI it is aminated to TATB. Thus, materials that would have to be destroyed when no longer needed are converted into a high value explosive.

== See also ==
- FOX-7
- Plastic bonded explosive
- RE factor
