= List of UN numbers 0401 to 0500 =

UN numbers from UN0401 to UN0500 as assigned by the United Nations Committee of Experts on the Transport of Dangerous Goods are as follows:

== UN 0401 to UN 0500 ==
UN Number	Class	Proper Shipping Name
UN 0401	1.1D	Dipicryl sulfide, dry or wetted with less than 10 percent water, by mass
UN 0402	1.1D	Ammonium perchlorate
UN 0403	1.4G	Flares, aerial
UN 0404	1.4S	Flares, aerial
UN 0405	1.4S	Cartridges, signal
UN 0406	1.3C	Dinitrosobenzene
UN 0407	1.4C	Tetrazol-1-acetic acid
UN 0408	1.1D	Fuzes, detonating, with protective features
UN 0409	1.3D	Fuzes, detonating, with protective features
UN 0410	1.4D	Fuzes, detonating, with protective features
UN 0411	1.1D	Pentaerythrite tetranitrate or Pentaerythritol tetranitrate or PETN, with not less than 7 percent wax by mass
UN 0412	1.4E	Cartridges for weapons, with bursting charge
UN 0413	1.2C	Cartridges for weapons, blank
UN 0414	1.2C	Charges, propelling, for cannon
UN 0415	1.2C	Charges, propelling
UN 0416	?	(UN No. no longer in use) Charges, propelling, for rocket motors (UN No. no longer in use)
UN 0417	1.3C	Cartridges for weapons, inert projectile or Cartridges, small arms
UN 0418	1.1G	Flares, surface
UN 0419	1.2G	Flares, surface
UN 0420	1.1G	Flares, aerial
UN 0421	1.2G	Flares, aerial
UN 0422	?	(UN No. no longer in use) Squibs (UN No. no longer in use)
UN 0423	?	(UN No. no longer in use) Squibs (UN No. no longer in use)
UN 0424	1.3G	Projectiles, inert with tracer
UN 0425	1.4G	Projectiles, inert with tracer
UN 0426	1.2F	Projectiles, with burster or expelling charge
UN 0427	1.4F	Projectiles, with burster or expelling charge
UN 0428	1.1G	Articles, pyrotechnic for technical purposes
UN 0429	1.2G	Articles, pyrotechnic for technical purposes
UN 0430	1.3G	Articles, pyrotechnic for technical purposes
UN 0431	1.4G	Articles, pyrotechnic for technical purposes
UN 0432	1.4S	Articles, pyrotechnic for technical purposes
UN 0433	1.1C	Powder cake, wetted or Powder paste, wetted with not less than 17 percent alcohol by mass
UN 0434	1.2G	Projectiles, with burster or expelling charge
UN 0435	1.4G	Projectiles, with burster or expelling charge
UN 0436	1.2C	Rockets, with expelling charge
UN 0437	1.3C	Rockets, with expelling charge
UN 0438	1.4C	Rockets, with expelling charge
UN 0439	1.2D	Charges, shaped, without detonator
UN 0440	1.4D	Charges, shaped, without detonator
UN 0441	1.4S	Charges, shaped, without detonator
UN 0442	1.1D	Charges, explosive, commercial without detonator
UN 0443	1.2D	Charges, explosive, commercial without detonator
UN 0444	1.4D	Charges, explosive, commercial without detonator
UN 0445	1.4S	Charges, explosive, commercial without detonator
UN 0446	1.4C	Cases, combustible, empty, without primer
UN 0447	1.3C	Cases, combustible, empty, without primer
UN 0448	1.4C	5-Mercaptotetrazol-1-acetic acid
UN 0449	1.1J	Torpedoes, liquid fueled, with or without bursting charge
UN 0450	1.3J	Torpedoes, liquid fueled, with inert head
UN 0451	1.1D	Torpedoes with bursting charge
UN 0452	1.4G	Grenades, practice, hand or rifle
UN 0453	1.4G	Rockets, line-throwing
UN 0454	1.4S	Igniters
UN 0455	1.4S	Detonators, non-electric, for blasting
UN 0456	1.4S	Detonators, electric, for blasting
UN 0457	1.1D	Charges, bursting, plastics bonded
UN 0458	1.2D	Charges, bursting, plastics bonded
UN 0459	1.4D	Charges, bursting, plastics bonded
UN 0460	1.4S	Charges, bursting, plastics bonded
UN 0461	1.1B	Components, explosive train, n.o.s.
UN 0462	1.1C	Articles, explosive, n.o.s.
UN 0463	1.1D	Articles, explosive, n.o.s.
UN 0464	1.1E	Articles, explosive, n.o.s.
UN 0465	1.1F	Articles, explosive, n.o.s.
UN 0466	1.2C	Articles, explosive, n.o.s.
UN 0467	1.2D	Articles, explosive, n.o.s.
UN 0468	1.2E	Articles, explosive, n.o.s.
UN 0469	1.2F	Articles, explosive, n.o.s.
UN 0470	1.3C	Articles, explosive, n.o.s.
UN 0471	1.4E	Articles, explosive, n.o.s.
UN 0472	1.4F	Articles, explosive, n.o.s.
UN 0473	1.1A	Substances, explosive, n.o.s.
UN 0474	1.1C	Substances, explosive, n.o.s.
UN 0475	1.1D	Substances, explosive, n.o.s.
UN 0476	1.1G	Substances, explosive, n.o.s.
UN 0477	1.3C	Substances, explosive, n.o.s.
UN 0478	1.3G	Substances, explosive, n.o.s.
UN 0479	1.4C	Substances, explosive, n.o.s.
UN 0480	1.4D	Substances, explosive, n.o.s.
UN 0481	1.4S	Substances, explosive, n.o.s.
UN 0482	1.5D	Substances, explosive, very insensitive, n.o.s. or Substances, EVI, n.o.s.
UN 0483	1.1D	Cyclotrimethylenetrinitramine, desensitized or Cyclonite, desensitized or Hexogen, desensitized or RDX, desensitized
UN 0484	1.1D	Cyclotetramethylenetetranitramine, desensitized or Octogen, desensitized or HMX, desensitized
UN 0485	1.4G	Substances, explosive, n.o.s.
UN 0486	1.6N	Articles, explosive, extremely insensitive or Articles, EEI
UN 0487	1.3G	Signals, smoke
UN 0488	1.3G	Ammunition, practice
UN 0489	1.1D	Dinitroglycoluril or Dingu
UN 0490	1.1D	Nitrotriazolone or NTO
UN 0491	1.4C	Charges, propelling
UN 0492	1.3G	Signals, railway track, explosive
UN 0493	1.4G	Signals, railway track, explosive
UN 0494	1.4D	Jet, perforating guns, charged, oil well, without detonator
UN 0495	1.3C	Propellant, liquid
UN 0496	1.1D	Octonal
UN 0497	1.1C	Propellant, liquid
UN 0498	1.1C	Propellant, solid
UN 0499	1.3C	Propellant, solid
UN 0500	1.4S	Detonator assemblies, non-electric, for blasting

== See also ==
- Lists of UN numbers
