= TEX (explosive) =

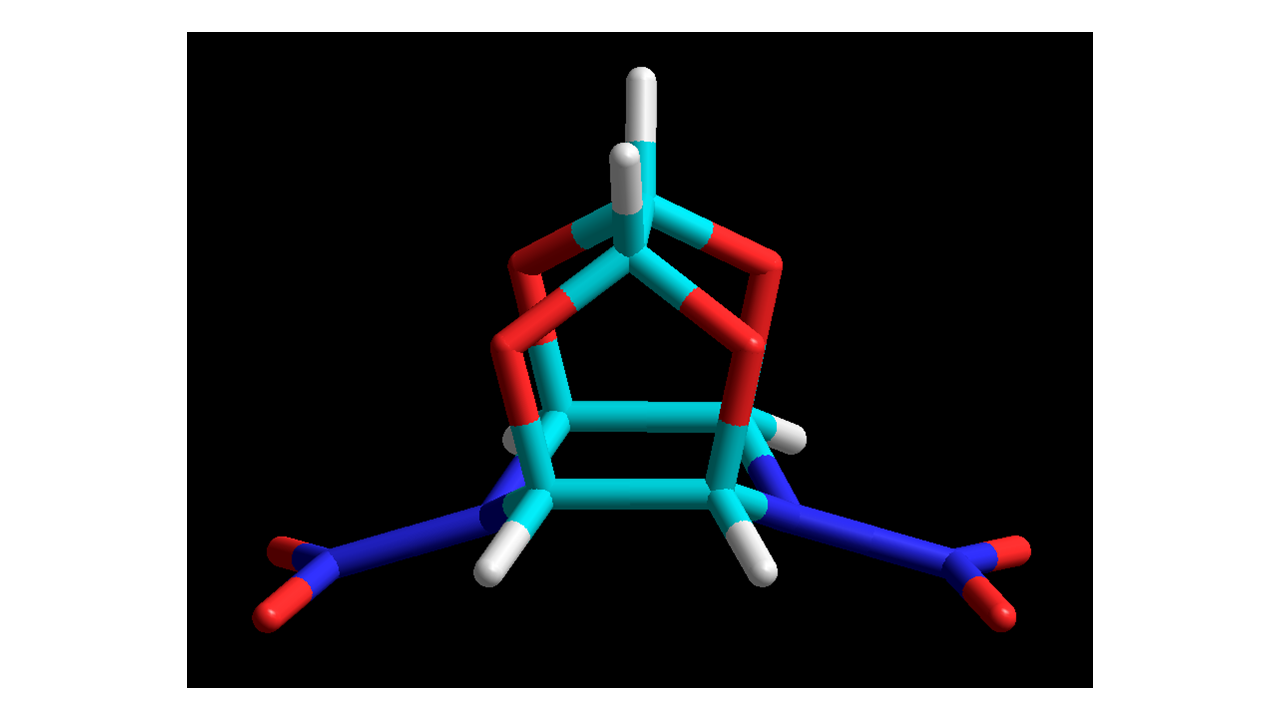

Names
- Preferred IUPAC name (2r,3aR,5S,6R,7aS,9r)-4,7-Dinitrohexahydro-2H-5,2,6-(epoxymethanetriyloxy)[1,3]dioxolo[4,5-b]pyrazine

Identifiers
CAS Number	130919-56-1
3D model (JSmol)	Interactive image
ChEMBL	ChEMBL1992897
ChemSpider	328939
PubChem CID	370572
CompTox Dashboard (EPA)	DTXSID701152346
- InChI: InChI=1S/C6H6N4O8/c11-9(12)7-1-2-8(10(13)14)4-3(7)17-6(18-4)5(15-1)16-2/h1-6H Key: XXEQEMFCUFXLME-UHFFFAOYSA-N
- SMILES: C12C3N(C4C(N1[N+](=O)[O-])OC(O4)C(O2)O3)[N+](=O)[O-]

Properties
Chemical formula	C_{6}H_{6}N_{4}O_{8}
Molar mass	262.134 g·mol^{−1}
Appearance	Colorless solid
Density	1.985 g/cm^{3}

Explosive data
Shock sensitivity	Low
Friction sensitivity	Low
Detonation velocity	8500 m/s
RE factor	1.70

Hazards
Autoignition temperature	252 °C (486 °F; 525 K)
- Except where otherwise noted, data are given for materials in their standard state (at 25 °C [77 °F], 100 kPa). Infobox references

TEX (chemical name 4,10-dinitro-2,6,8,12-tetraoxa-4,10-diazatetracyclo[5.5.0.0^{5,9}.0^{3,11}]-dodecane) is a dense (ρ = 1.985 g cm^{−3}) nitramine high explosive, that derives from the very powerful and sensitive high explosive CL-20. Though related to CL-20 in that is shares the same cage structure, TEX is more easily synthesized in good yield from inexpensive starting materials. Unlike CL-20, TEX is friction insensitive, bears a low impact sensitivity, and possesses a very low shock sensitivity and large critical diameter, making it an interesting explosive filler for insensitive munitions. Its systematic name, 4,10-dinitro-2,6,8,12-tetraoxa-4,10-diazatetracyclo[5.5.0.0^{5,9}.0^{3,11}]-dodecane derives from its tetracyclic structure.

== Synthesis and production ==
Unlike CL-20, which requires a cumbersome and even costly procedure, TEX is obtained in moderate yield (40 wt.-%) in a one-pot synthesis from 1,4-diformyl-2,3,5,6-tetrahydroxypiperazine (DFTHP) and mixed acid (H_{2}SO_{4}/HNO_{3}). The DFTHP undergoes proton-catalyzed hydrolysis and yields glyoxal which reacts as with an intermediate to give TEX.

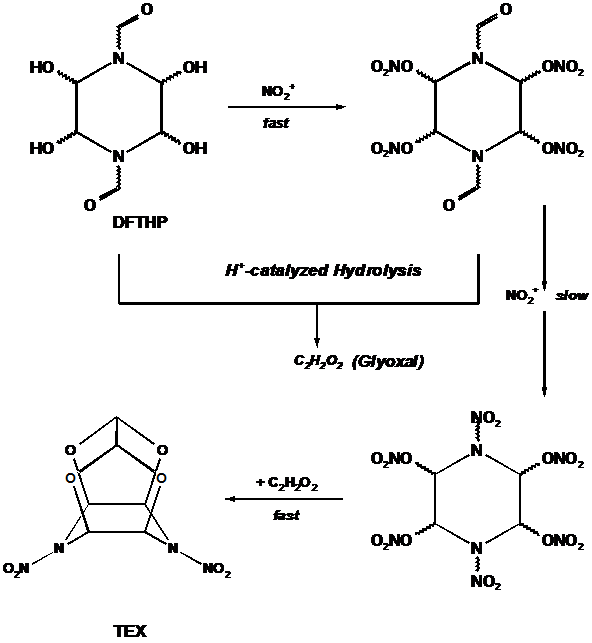
Formation of TEX from DFTHP

== Performance ==
Based on the Kamlet-Jacobs method, the formal idealistic detonation of TEX

C_{6}H_{6}N_{4}O_{8} → 3 H_{2}O_{(g)} + 2CO_{2} + CO + 3 C_{(gr)} + 2 N_{2}

at ambient temperature and density of TEX (1.985 g/cm^{3}) yields a detonation velocity of 8170 m/s and a CJ pressure of 31.4 GPa. Calculations with advanced computational algorithms like EXPLO and CHEETAH predict even higher detonation velocity but about similar values for the detonation pressure, definitely superseding insensitive high explosive NTO. Experimental determination with plastic bonded formulations at high theoretical maximum density exceed the predicted detonation pressures but fall a little short with regards to the detonation velocity if the charge diameter is below 90 mm.

== Sensitivity ==
TEX is not friction sensitive and requires some 40 Joules energy to react in the BAM impact tester. In the autoignition test it yields a mild burn response at 252 °C onset temperature. TEX is also mildly shock sensitive in the Large Scale Gap Test (LSGT).

== Toxicity ==
TEX has a similar water solubility as RDX and hence will be equally mobile in soil and groundwater. However, in comparison to insensitive explosive NTO, which is highly soluble in water (16 g/L), it should pose a lower level of concern when considering the environmental effects of unexploded or partially exploded charges. Preliminary investigation of the effects of TEX on daphnia and cell cultures show slightly lower toxicity than RDX.

== Application ==
Though known since 1990, TEX is still an experimental explosive. However, given its large critical diameter and low shock sensitivity, it is an ideal candidate for insensitive large-calibre ammunition such as general-purpose bombs, artillery shells, torpedoes and depth charges.

== See also ==
- Insensitive munition
- RE factor
