= Insensitive munition =

Munitions designed to withstand heat, shock, and nearby explosions

Insensitive munitions are munitions that are designed to withstand stimuli representative of severe but credible accidents. The range of stimuli are shock (from bullets, fragments and shaped charge jets), heat (from fires or adjacent thermal events) and adjacent detonating munitions. A munition can have its vulnerability reduced by a number of means used on their own or in combination such as a reduced vulnerability energetic material, design features, additions or changes to packaging etc. The munition must still retain its terminal effect and performance within acceptable parameters.

== Description ==
Insensitive munitions (IM) will only burn (rather than explode) when subjected to fast or slow heating, bullets, shrapnel, shaped charges, or the detonation of another nearby munition. The term refers to warheads, bombs, and rocket motors, although different countries' armed forces may have their own definitions.

Due to "accidents, and the subsequent loss of human life, cost of repairing and replacing material, and the toll taken on operational readiness and capability, Insensitive Munitions (IM) improvements are mandated by law in the U.S."

Three approaches are taken when designing insensitive munitions: Firstly, the high energy device can be protected and transported with an external protection of some kind. Some munition shipping containers are designed to provide some protection and thermal insulation. Secondly, the chemistry of the high energy fill is chosen to provide a higher degree of stability, for example by using plastic bonded explosives. Lastly, the casings of high energy devices can be designed in such a way as to allow venting or some other form of pressure relief in a fire.

Beyond the three approaches above, other threats need addressing when designing IM, e.g., slow and fast cook-off, sympathetic detonation, bullet and fragment impact, and shaped charge jet impact. Extensive testing requirements for potential IM candidates to address these threats are extremely costly. Modeling programs are being designed to simulate the threat of bullet and fragment impact in an effort to reduce testing costs. One of the most promising methods that engineers and scientists within the U.S. Department of Defense are employing to help to enhance IM performance is by using advanced multiphysics modeling programs. Also, another effort is underway developing 2-D numerical code that will simulate the threat of slow and fast cook-off.

== Insensitive high explosives ==
Insensitive munitions are almost always filled with fire resistant, shock resistant insensitive high explosives (IHE) such as triaminotrinitrobenzene (TATB) or various insensitive explosive mixtures, or plastic/polymer-bonded explosives, which are similar to reactive materials. TATB particularly will not detonate if impacted by typical fragments or burned in a fire.

A new IHE called Insensitive Munitions Explosive (IMX-101) has been qualified and approved by the U.S. Army to replace trinitrotoluene (TNT). IMX-101 is said to have the "same lethality as traditional TNT, but is far less likely to explode if dropped, shot at or hit by a roadside bomb during transport". This IHE has been tested and proven to be a safer alternative within large-caliber projectiles utilized by the Army and Marine Corps.

Other insensitive high explosives include nitroguanidine, 1,1-diamino-2,2-dinitroethylene (FOX-7), and 4,10-dinitro-2,6,8,12-tetraoxa-4,10-diazatetracyclo[5.5.0.0^{5,9}.0^{3,11}]-dodecane (TEX).

IHEs often combine amino groups and nitro groups in the same molecule.

Within the United States Department of Energy (DOE) and National Nuclear Safety Administration, the term IHE has very specific meaning. In fact, under the DOE's definition, an explosive or explosive mixture (e.g., Plastic Bonded Explosives) cannot be described as an IHE without meeting rigorous testing and qualification criteria as described in the DOE Technical Standard "Explosive Safety."

=== Origin ===
Following the 1966 Palomares B-52 crash and the 1968 Thule Air Base B-52 crash, concerns were raised by accident investigators about the high explosive used in the nuclear devices, which had detonated on impact. Efforts were started to find an explosive that was stable enough to withstand the forces involved in an aircraft accident. The Lawrence Livermore National Laboratory developed the "Susan Test" – a standard test designed to simulate an aircraft accident by squeezing and nipping explosive material between metal surfaces of a test projectile. Following experiments with this device, the Los Alamos National Laboratory developed a new safer type of explosive, called insensitive high explosive (IHE), for use in U.S. nuclear weapons.

IHE explosives can withstand impacts up to 1,500 feet per second (460 m/s), as opposed to conventional HE, which will detonate at only 100 feet per second (30 m/s).

=== Use in nuclear weapons ===
Insensitive high explosives have been available to the United States military for use in its nuclear weapons since 1979—by 1991, 25% of the country's nuclear stockpile was using IHE. Most modern American nuclear weapons, and at least those of the United Kingdom, are manufactured using insensitive munition designs. These are almost exclusively TATB plastic bonded explosive (LX-17-0 and PBX-9502). Conventional high explosives are still used in missiles and nuclear artillery shells where weight and volume is a factor (IHE by weight contains only two-thirds the energy of HE, so more is needed to achieve the same effect).

== See also ==
- Hexanitrostilbene
- Dunnite
- Reactive material
