= Future Force unit of action =

Proposed US Army tactical unit

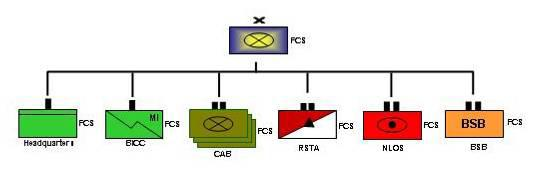
Future Combat Systems (Brigade Unit of Action) organizational chart

The Future Force unit of action (UA) was designed by the United States Army’s tactical war-fighting echelon. Although optimized for offensive operations, the Future Combat Systems (FCS) equipped unit of action (UA) was intended to have the ability to execute a full spectrum of operations. Each will consist of:

- 3 combined arms battalions (CABs)
- 1 non-line-of-sight (NLOS) cannon battalion
- 1 reconnaissance surveillance and target acquisition (RSTA) squadron
- 1 forward support battalion (FSB)
- 1 brigade intelligence and communications company (BICC)
- 1 headquarters company

== See also ==
British Army's Future Army Structure (Next Steps), for comparison.
