= IMX-101 =

Explosive mixture

IMX-101 is a high-performance insensitive high explosive composite mixture developed by BAE Systems and the United States Army to replace TNT in artillery shells. IMX stands for "Insensitive Munitions eXplosives", which refers to the purpose of IMX-101: to provide explosive force equivalent to TNT without its sensitivity to shocks such as gunfire, explosions from improvised explosive devices, fire, and shrapnel. For example, the United States Army believes that a training incident in Nevada which killed seven Marines would not have occurred with the new explosive. On March 23, 2013, the United States Army ordered $780 million worth of the explosive, with a production of millions of pounds annually, to be produced by BAE at Holston Army Ammunition Plant in Tennessee. The new explosive will cost $8 per pound, compared to $6 per pound for TNT. As of 2023, IMX-101 filled shells are being used in the 2022 Russian invasion of Ukraine.

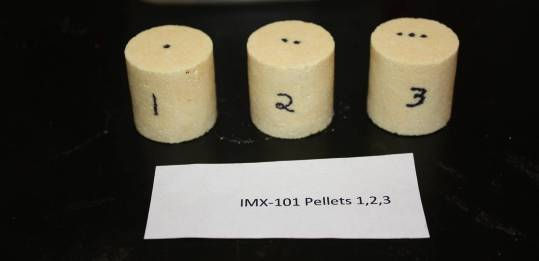
IMX-101 pellets

Time Magazine called IMX-101 one of the "50 best inventions of 2010".

== Composition ==
IMX-101 is composed of 2,4-dinitroanisole (DNAN), nitrotriazolone (NTO), and nitroguanidine (NQ). The nominal composition is 43.5 wt% DNAN, 36.8 wt% NQ, and 19.7 wt% NTO. Trace amounts of N-methyl-p-nitroaniline (MNA) are included in some formulations to aid in processing. A formulation containing about 24 wt% aluminum and 76 wt% IMX-101 is called ALIMX-101 and is being investigated as an insensitive replacement for H6 and PBXN-109 in Mk82-style bombs.

A Family of Insensitive Melt Cast Explosive Formulations: Insensitive Melt Cast Explosives manufactured at Holston Army Ammunition Plant
| Formulation | Key Ingredients | Replaces | Purpose | Qualification Status (2012) |
|---|---|---|---|---|
| IMX-101 | DNAN + NTO + NQ | TNT | Artillery and other large caliber munitions | Material qualified; Type qualified for 155mm M795, on-going for 155mm M1122 and 105mm projectiles |
| IMX-104 | DNAN + NTO + RDX | Comp B | Mortar applications | Material qualified; Type qualification on-going for 81mm mortar, 60mm & 120mm to follow |
| PAX-48 | DNAN + NTO + HMX | Comp B | Mortar and tank ammunition | Material qualified; Type qualification achieved for 120mm IM HE-T tracer round (NAMMO) |
| OSX-12 | DNAN + NTO + RDX + Al | PAX-28 | High blast applications | Material under evaluation |
| PAX-21 Picatinny arsenal explosive | DNAN + RDX + AP + MNA (N-methyl-p-nitroaniline) | | Main fill for the 60mm M768 mortar rounds | Being used in theater |
| PAX-41 | DNAN + RDX + MNA | | Main fill for the Spider Grenade, thus a low critical diameter is required. | |

The performance of PAX-28, a thermobaric, containing a mixture of RDX, DNAN, Al, AP and MNA was found to have an indoor explosive equivalency factor of 1.62 when compared to Composition B. OSX-12 is being studied as a replacement to PAX-28.

== Processing ==
Like Composition B, IMX formulations are melt-castable without thermal degradation, and are thus processed into munitions by a melt pour process starting with a batch melt kettle heated by a steam heat exchanger.

== See also ==
- M107 projectile
- XM1128 projectile
