= XM1100 Scorpion =

American anti-vehicle landmine

The XM1100 Scorpion, formerly known as the Intelligent Munitions System, was an anti-vehicle, smart ground munition developed by Textron Defense Systems as a safer alternative to traditional landmines. The Scorpion was originally a component of the Future Combat Systems program. It was a remotely controlled, integrated system of lethal and non-lethal munitions, ground sensors, and communication technology that could autonomously detect, track, and destroy light-wheeled to heavy-tracked vehicles.

== Overview ==
The XM1100 Scorpion consists of a control station and a dispensing module containing the munitions. Each dispensing module can cover a minimum lethal area of 35 meters in diameter, which can be arranged to overlap the fields of other dispensing modules in order to expand the total range of surveillance. An operator supervising a single XM1100 Scorpion control station can control the activity of its corresponding dispensing module at a range of up to 3 kilometers. Unlike traditional landmines, the activity of the XM1100 Scorpion munitions can be remotely turned on or off by the operator, allowing friendly vehicles to pass through the lethal area unharmed if necessary. However, once activated, the XM1100 Scorpion can fire four anti-vehicle smart munitions into the air, releasing a guided warhead on the target. The system is also connected to the Army Battle Command Network, which allows military personnel to monitor enemy and non-combatant activity as well as prevent unwanted or unused munitions from becoming buried and forgotten.

== Development ==
Development for the XM1100 Scorpion began as a response to the U.S. landmine policy directive of 2004, which banned the use of persistent landmines. In July 2006, the U.S. Department of Defense (DoD) awarded Textron Defense Systems with a $115 million contract for the design and development of the XM1100 Scorpion and the similarly smart XM-7 Spider landmine system as part of the DoD's Future Combat Systems (FCS) acquisition program. However, decreases in the Army's funding and the high cost of developing the munition system caused the DoD to delete the project from the FCS contract, and the XM1100 Scorpion was established as a stand-alone program in January 2007 under the supervision of the Army's Project Manager for Close Combat Systems (PM-CCS).

During its development, the XM1100 Scorpion underwent multiple performance tests and design reviews. In 2009, a test series of the system at Fort Benning, Georgia evaluated the XM1100 Scorpion's ability to identify and engage targets in urban environments. Scientists in the Survivability Lethality Analysis Directorate (SLAD) at the U.S. Army Research Laboratory (ARL) also conducted a series of live firing demonstrations at White Sands Missile Range in New Mexico and determined that the XM1100 Scorpion had achieved a “mobility kill,” demonstrating its capabilities in identifying and engaging remote-controlled, mobile targets. In 2010, successful performance testing at Yuma Proving Ground in Arizona showed that the XM1100 Scorpion had verified its operational reliability across all operational environments. However, the XM1100 Scorpion still faced termination risk due to lack of funding. In contrast, the development of the XM-7 Spider continued unhindered due to a $34 million contract awarded by Picatinny Arsenal in 2011. By 2013, the XM1100 Scorpion was integrated into the XM-7 Spider program.

== See also ==
- M7 Spider
