= Guanidine nitrate =

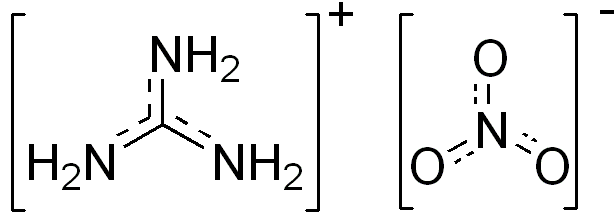

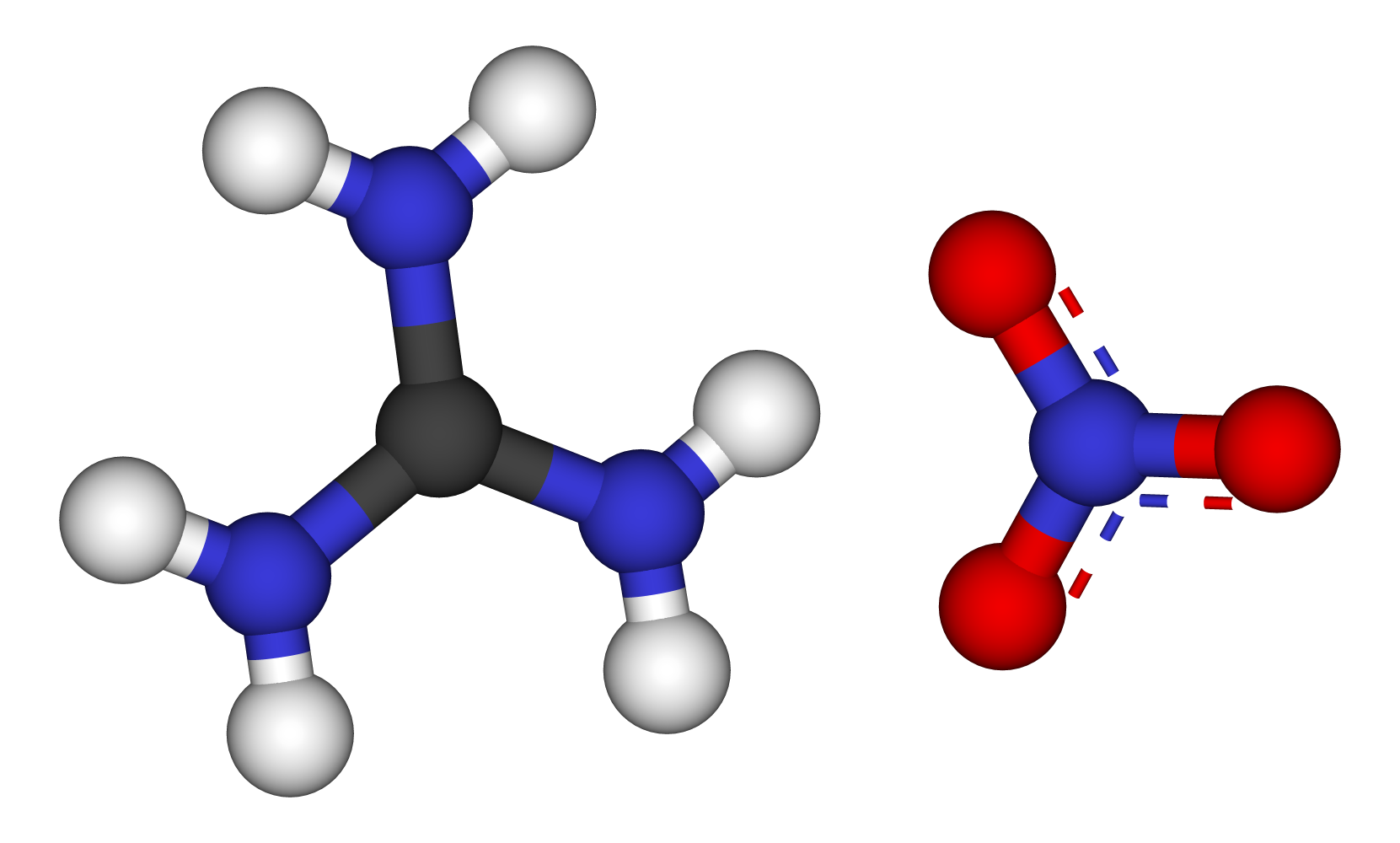
- Ball-and-stick models of the constituent ions

Names
- IUPAC name Guanidinium nitrate

Identifiers
CAS Number	506-93-4
3D model (JSmol)	Interactive image
ChemSpider	10049
ECHA InfoCard	100.007.328
EC Number	208-060-1
PubChem CID	10481
RTECS number	MF4350000
UNII	B542239A4E
UN number	1467
CompTox Dashboard (EPA)	DTXSID3027164
- InChI: InChI=1S/CH5N3.HNO3/c2*2-1(3)4/h(H5,2,3,4);(H,2,3,4) Key: CNUNWZZSUJPAHX-UHFFFAOYSA-N; InChI=1/CH5N3.HNO3/c2*2-1(3)4/h(H5,2,3,4);(H,2,3,4) Key: CNUNWZZSUJPAHX-UHFFFAOYAZ
- SMILES: C(=N)(N)N.[N+](=O)(O)[O-]

Properties
Chemical formula	CH_{5}N_{3}·HNO_{3}
Molar mass	122.084 g·mol^{−1}
Appearance	White solid
Density	1.44 g/cm^{3}
Melting point	213–215 °C (415–419 °F; 486–488 K)
Boiling point	Decomposes over 250 °C (482 °F; 523 K)
Solubility in water	50 mg/mL

Hazards
- GHS labelling
Pictograms	(GHS03: Oxidizing) (GHS07: Exclamation mark)
Signal word	Warning
Hazard statements	H272, H302, H319, H412
Precautionary statements	P210, P220, P221, P264, P270, P273, P280, P301+P312+P330, P305+P351+P338, P337+P313, P370+P378, P501
NFPA 704 (fire diamond)	2 3 3 OX
- Lethal dose or concentration (LD, LC)
LD_{50} (median dose)	730 mg/kg Oral, rat, female
LC_{50} (median concentration)	0.853 mg/l (4h, Inhalation, rat, m/f, dust/mist); 690 mg/l (96h, fathead minnow); 70.2 mg/l (48h, water flea)
Safety data sheet (SDS)	Sigma-Aldrich SDS
- Except where otherwise noted, data are given for materials in their standard state (at 25 °C [77 °F], 100 kPa). verify (what is ?) Infobox references

Guanidine nitrate is the chemical compound with the formula CH_{5}N_{3}·HNO_{3} (linear formula NH_{2}C(=NH)NH_{2}·HNO_{3}). It is a colorless, water-soluble salt. It is produced on a large scale and finds use as precursor for nitroguanidine, fuel in pyrotechnics and gas generators. Its correct name is guanidinium nitrate, but the colloquial term guanidine nitrate is widely used.

== Production and properties ==
Although it is the salt formed by neutralizing guanidine with nitric acid, guanidine nitrate is produced industrially by the reaction of dicyandiamide (or calcium salt) and ammonium nitrate.

It has been used as a monopropellant in the Jetex engine for model airplanes. It is attractive because it has a high gas output and low flame temperature. It has a relatively high monopropellant specific impulse of 177 seconds (1.7 kN·s/kg).

Guanidine nitrate's explosive decomposition is given by the following equation:

[C(NH_{2})_{3}]NO_{3} (s) → 3 H_{2}O (g) + 2 N_{2} (g) + C (s)

== Uses ==
Guanidine nitrate is used as the gas generator in automobile airbags. It is less toxic than the mixture used in older airbags of sodium azide, potassium nitrate and silica (NaN_{3}, KNO_{3}, and SiO_{2}), and it is less explosive and sensitive to moisture compared to the very cheap ammonium nitrate (NH_{4}NO_{3}).

== Safety ==
The compound is a hazardous substance, and is both a fuel and oxidizer. It is also harmful to the eyes, skin, and respiratory tract.
