= 2,4-Dinitroanisole =

Names
- Preferred IUPAC name 1-Methoxy-2,4-dinitrobenzene
- Other names 2,4-Dinitroanisole

Identifiers
CAS Number	119-27-7
3D model (JSmol)	Interactive image
Abbreviations	DNAN
ChEBI	CHEBI:84559
ChemSpider	8080
ECHA InfoCard	100.003.919
EC Number	204-310-9
PubChem CID	8385
UNII	1L0OD70295
CompTox Dashboard (EPA)	DTXSID9041366
- InChI: InChI=1S/C7H6N2O5/c1-14-7-3-2-5(8(10)11)4-6(7)9(12)13/h2-4H,1H3 Key: CVYZVNVPQRKDLW-UHFFFAOYSA-N
- SMILES: COC1=C(C=C(C=C1)[N+](=O)[O-])[N+](=O)[O-]

Properties
Chemical formula	C_{7}H_{6}N_{2}O_{5}
Molar mass	198.134 g·mol^{−1}
Appearance	pale yellow granular crystals or needles
Density	1.336 g/cm^{3}
Melting point	94.5 °C
Solubility in water	very slightly soluble

Hazards
- GHS labelling
Pictograms	(GHS02: Flammable) (GHS07: Exclamation mark) (GHS08: Health hazard)
Signal word	Warning
Hazard statements	H223, H302, H351
Precautionary statements	P201, P202, P264, P270, P281, P301+P312, P308+P313, P330, P405, P501
- Except where otherwise noted, data are given for materials in their standard state (at 25 °C [77 °F], 100 kPa). Infobox references

2,4-Dinitroanisole (DNAN) is a low sensitivity explosive organic compound. It has an anisole (methoxybenzene) core, with two nitro groups (–NO_{2}) attached.

It is not explosive itself unless it is mixed with other explosive chemicals in certain ratios. It has 90% of the explosive power of TNT, is less dense, and has a higher melting point.

== Properties ==
2,4-Dinitroanisole crystallises in the monoclinic form. The unit cell has these sizes and angles: a=8.772 Å b=12.645 Å c=15.429 Å 81.89°, cell volume is V=1694 Å^{3}, There are eight molecules in each unit cell, with four positions symmetric. The two asymmetric positions have the molecule bent in different ways. The methyl group can be rotated either at 5° or 13° out of the plane of the benzene ring. The ortho nitro group is rotated at 3° or 35°. The para nitro group is close to parallel with the ring plane.

The specific heat of solid 2,4-dinitroanisole is given by C_{p} (Jmol^{−1}K^{−1}) = 0.3153 + 0.00265T (T in K). At 298.15 K. it is 219.02 Jmol^{−1}K^{−1} The melting enthalpy is 20.2 kJmol^{−1} and solidification heat is 19.7 kJmol^{−1}. These can differ so much as the liquid can be supercooled 22.8 °C. The initial decomposition temperature is 295 °C, and the explosion temperature is 312 °C. On explosion the adiabatic temperature rise is 4923 °C. Ignition temperature is 347 °C.

== Reactions ==
2,4-Dinitroanisole reacts without heat with a potassium cyanide solution to form a red coloured product via the isopurpuric acid reaction. In this cyanide is added in the meta position, and the ortho nitro group is reduced to -NHOH.

In alkaline conditions DNAN can be attacked at the methoxy position with nucleophiles to form Meisenheimer complexes. In these the ring develops a negative charge and another group is attached at the methoxy attachment point. So for example, sodium methoxide can produce the 6,6-dimethoxy-1,3-dinitro-1,3-cyclohexadiene anion.

When heated under pressure with water and ammonia DNAN is converted to 2,4-dinitroaniline.

With iron and acetic acid DNAN nitro groups can be reduced to amines forming 2,4-diaminoanisole.

== Formation ==
2,4-Dinitroanisole can be formed from p-nitroanisole or o-nitroanisole nitration. Also it can be formed from 1-chloro-2,4-dinitrobenzene by treatment with sodium methoxide (sodium in methanol) or sodium hydroxide with methanol.

Over a period of days, alkalis will hydrolyse the ether bond to form 2,4-dinitrophenol.

== Use ==
2,4-Dinitroanisole is used as an explosive replacing TNT. It is used in explosive mixtures such as IMX-101, IMX-104, PAX-48, PAX-21 and PAX-41 in the spider grenade. It can be melted and cast more safely. It has also been used as a dye ingredient and insecticide.

== Environment ==
When mixed with soil, 2,4-dinitroanisole is modified by bacteria through the path 2-nitroso-4-nitroanisole, 2-hydroxyamino-4-nitroanisole to 2-amino-4-nitroanisole. This takes place on a time scale of a few weeks. In the human body it is converted to 2,4-dinitrophenol. It was reported in 2014 that a Nocardia sp. bacterium was able to mineralize 2, 4-dinitroanisole as a sole carbon source, via well-established 2,4-dinitrophenol pathway.

== See also ==
- Trinitroanisole
