= Future Combat Systems =

Modernization program of United States Army

Future Combat Systems logo

Future Combat Systems (FCS) was the United States Army's principal modernization program from 2003 to early 2009. Formally launched in 2003, FCS was envisioned to create new brigades equipped with new manned and unmanned vehicles linked by an unprecedented fast and flexible battlefield network. The U.S. Army claimed it was their "most ambitious and far-reaching modernization" program since World War II. Between 1995 and 2009, $32 billion was expended on programs such as this, "with little to show for it".

One of the programs that came out of the $32 billion expenditure was the concept of tracking friendly ("blue") forces on the field via a GPS-enabled computer system known as blue force tracking (BFT). The concept of BFT was implemented by the US Army through the Force XXI Battle Command Brigade and Below (FBCB2) platform. The FBCB2 system in particular and the BFT system in general have won numerous awards and accolades, including: recognition in 2001 as one of the five best-managed software programs in the entire U.S. Government, the 2003 Institute for Defense and Government Advancement's award for most innovative U.S. Government program, the 2003 Federal Computer Week Monticello Award (given in recognition of an information system that has a direct, meaningful impact on human lives), and the Battlespace Information 2005 "Best Program in Support of Coalition Operations". The proof-of-concept success of FBCB2, its extensive testing during Operation Foal Eagle (FE 99, FE 00), its certification at Fort Irwin National Training Center, and its proven field usage in live combat operations spanning over a decade in Iraq and Afghanistan have led to BFT adoption by many users including the United States Marine Corps, the United States Air Force, the United States Navy ground-based expeditionary forces (e.g., United States Naval Special Warfare Command (NSWC) and Navy Expeditionary Combat Command (NECC) units), the United Kingdom, and German Soldier System IdZ-ES+.

In April and May 2009, Pentagon and army officials announced that the FCS vehicle-development effort would be canceled. The rest of the FCS effort would be swept into a new, pan-army program called the Army Brigade Combat Team Modernization Program.

== Development history ==
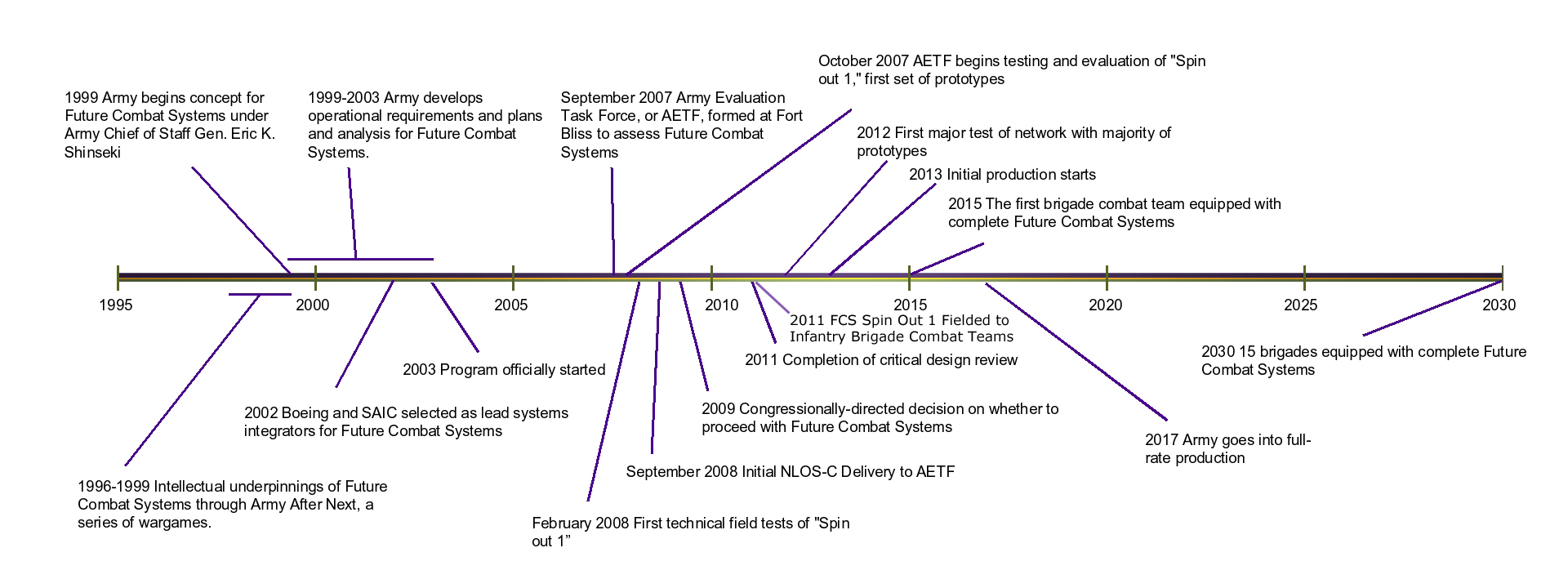
FCS timeline (click to view)

The early joint DARPA–Army Future Combat Systems program to replace the M1 Abrams main battle tank and Bradley Fighting Vehicles envisioned robotic vehicles weighing under six tons each and controlled remotely by manned command and control vehicles.

In February 2001 DARPA awarded $5.5 million to eight teams to develop unmanned ground combat vehicles (UGCV). Teams led by General Dynamics Land Systems, Carnegie Mellon University, and Omnitech Robotics were awarded nearly $1 million each to develop UGCVs prototypes. Five other teams were to develop UGCVs payloads.

In May 2003 the DoD commenced the development and demonstration phase in a $14.92 billion contract.

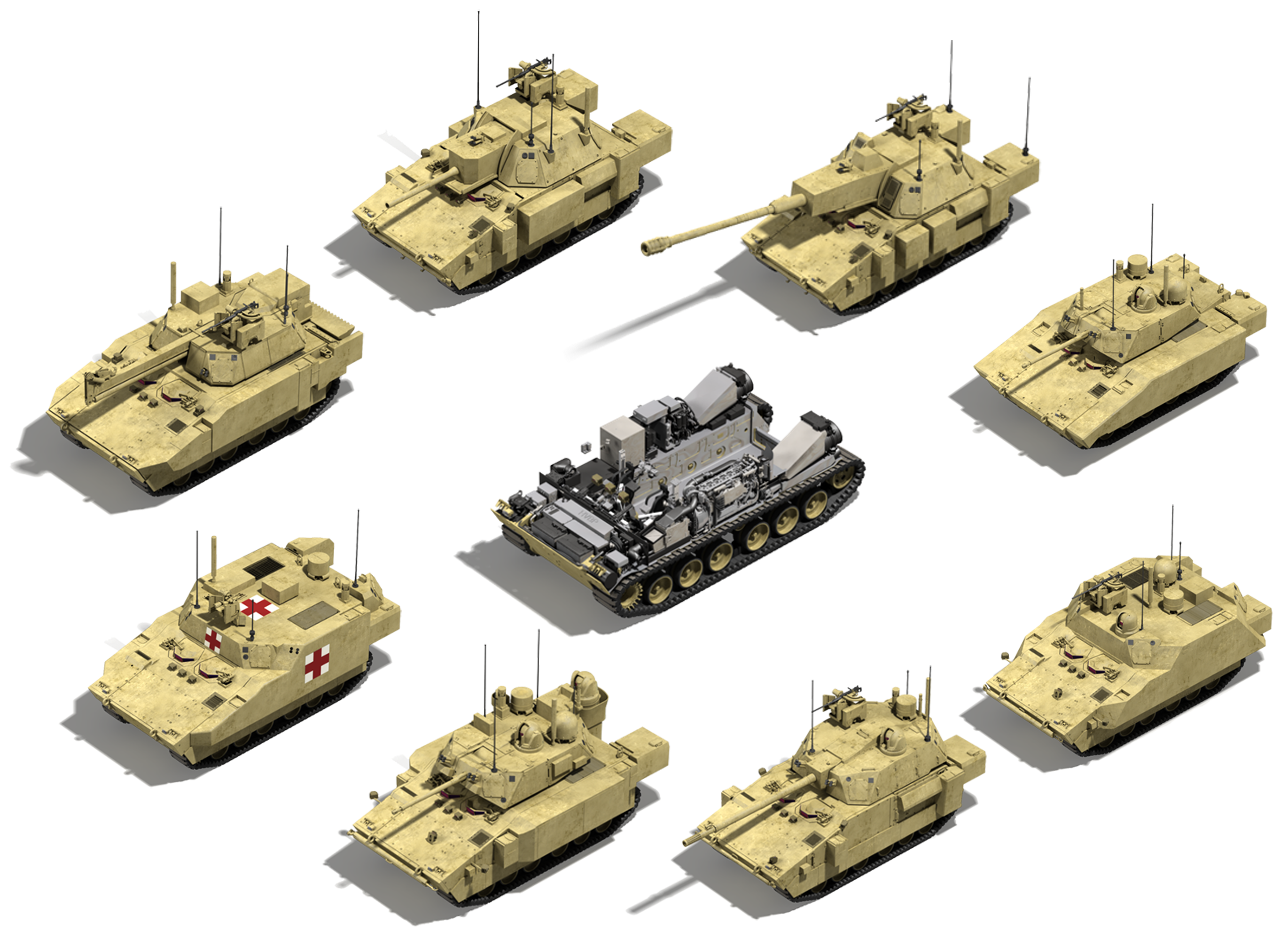
FCS Manned Ground Vehicles family and common chassis

As planned, FCS included the network, unattended ground sensors (UGS), unmanned aerial vehicles (UAVs), unmanned ground vehicles, and the eight manned ground vehicles.

The Boeing Company and Science Applications International Corporation (SAIC) worked together as the lead systems integrators, coordinating more than 550 contractors and subcontractors in 41 states.

A spiral model was planned for FCS development and upgrades. As of 2004, FCS was in the System Development and Demonstration (SDD) phase, which included four two-year spirals. Spiral 1 was to begin fielding in Fiscal Year 2008 and consist of prototypes for use and evaluation. Following successful evaluation, production and fielding of Spiral 2 would have commenced in 2010. The evaluation was conducted by the Army Evaluation Task Force (AETF), previously known as Evaluation Brigade Combat Team (EBCT), stationed in Fort Bliss. As of December 2007, AETF consisted of 1,000 soldiers from the 1st Armored Division.

In August 2005, the program met 100% of the criteria in its most important milestone, System of Systems Functional Review. On October 5, 2005, Pentagon team recommended "further delaying the Army's Future Combat Systems program" in light of the costs of the Iraq War, Hurricane Katrina, and expected declines in future budgets.

The Pentagon announced plans in January 2006 to cut $236 million over five years from the $25 billion FCS 2007–2011 budget. The entire program was expected to cost $340 billion. As of late December 2006, funding was scaled back for critical elements of the overall FCS battlespace, and the most advanced elements were deferred.

Decreases in the Army’s funding and the high cost of developing the intelligent munition system caused the DoD to delete the project from the FCS contract, and the XM1100 Scorpion was established as a stand-alone program in January 2007.

The Class II and Class III UAVs were canceled in May 2007.

In June 2007, the Government Accountability Office (GAO) criticized the "close working relationship" between the Army and the lead system integrators. The GAO recommended the Office of the Secretary of Defense reassert its oversight authority and prepare an alternative should FCS be canceled. The Department of Defense agreed with the latter suggestion, to which the Army responded by calling the GAO report "rooted in the past, not the present".

In 2008, the program had completed about one-third of its development, which was planned to run through 2030. Technical field tests began in 2008. The first combat brigade equipped with FCS had been expected to deploy around 2015, followed by full production to equip up to 15 brigades by 2030, but the program had not met the initial plan of field testing an actual FCS-equipped combat unit by 2008.

On April 6, 2009, President Barack Obama's Secretary of Defense, Robert Gates announced plans to cut FCS spending as part of a shift toward spending more on counter-terrorism and less to prepare for conventional warfare against large states like China and Russia. This included, but was not limited to, canceling the series of Manned Ground Vehicles.

In May 2009, the proposed DoD budget for fiscal year 2010 had minimal funding for Manned Ground Vehicles research. The Army planned to restart from the beginning on manned ground vehicles. The service was to restructure FCS so more Army units will be supported.

Boeing passed a preliminary design review of all 14 subsystems in May 2009.

Future Combat Systems Background and Issues for Congress report following cancelation

The DoD released a memorandum on 23 June 2009 that canceled the Future Combat Systems program and replaced it with separate programs under the Army Brigade Combat Team Modernization umbrella to meet the Army's plans.

== Subsystems ==
=== Active subsystems ===
The following subsystems were swept into the Brigade Combat Team Modernization Program:

- FCS Network
- Future Force Warrior
- Vehicles

- Future Combat Systems Manned Ground Vehicles (canceled along with FCS superseded with the Ground Combat Vehicle program)

- XM1201 reconnaissance and surveillance vehicle (RSV)
- XM1202 mounted combat system (MCS)
- XM1203 non-line-of-sight cannon (NLOS-C)
- XM1204 non-line-of-sight mortar (NLOS-M)
- XM1205 recovery and maintenance vehicle (FRMV)
- XM1206 infantry carrier vehicle (ICV)
- XM1207 medical vehicle – evacuation (MV-E)
- XM1208 medical vehicle – treatment (MV-T)
- XM1209 command and control vehicle (C2V)

- Multifunctional utility/logistics and equipment vehicle (swept into BCT modernization and subsequently canceled)

- XM1219 ARV
- XM1218 countermine
- XM1217 transport

- XM1216 small unmanned ground vehicle (SUGV) (swept into BCT Modernization)
- XM156 Class I Unmanned Aerial Vehicle (swept into BCT Modernization and subsequently canceled)

- Class II UAVs for Companies (canceled early on)
- Class III UAVs for Battalions (canceled early on)
- XM157 Class IV Unmanned Aerial Vehicle (swept into BCT Modernization and subsequently canceled)

- Devices

- XM1100: Intelligent Munitions System
- XM501 Non-Line-of-Sight Launch System (swept into BCT Modernization and subsequently canceled)
- AN/PSW-2 Common System Controller (CC)
- Unattended Ground Sensors (UGS) (swept into BCT Modernization and subsequently canceled)

=== Operating system ===
FCS was networked via an advanced architecture, called System of Systems Common Operating Environment (SOSCOE) that would enable enhanced joint connectivity and situational awareness (see Network-centric warfare). SOSCOE targets x86-Linux, VxWorks, and LynxOS. The FCS (BCT) network consists of five layers that when combined would provide seamless delivery of data: The Standards, Transport, Services, Applications, and Sensors and Platforms Layers. The FCS (BCT) network possesses the adaptability and management functionality required to maintain pertinent services, while the FCS (BCT) fights on a rapidly shifting battlespace giving them the advantage to take initiative. FCS would network existing systems, systems already under development, and systems to be developed.

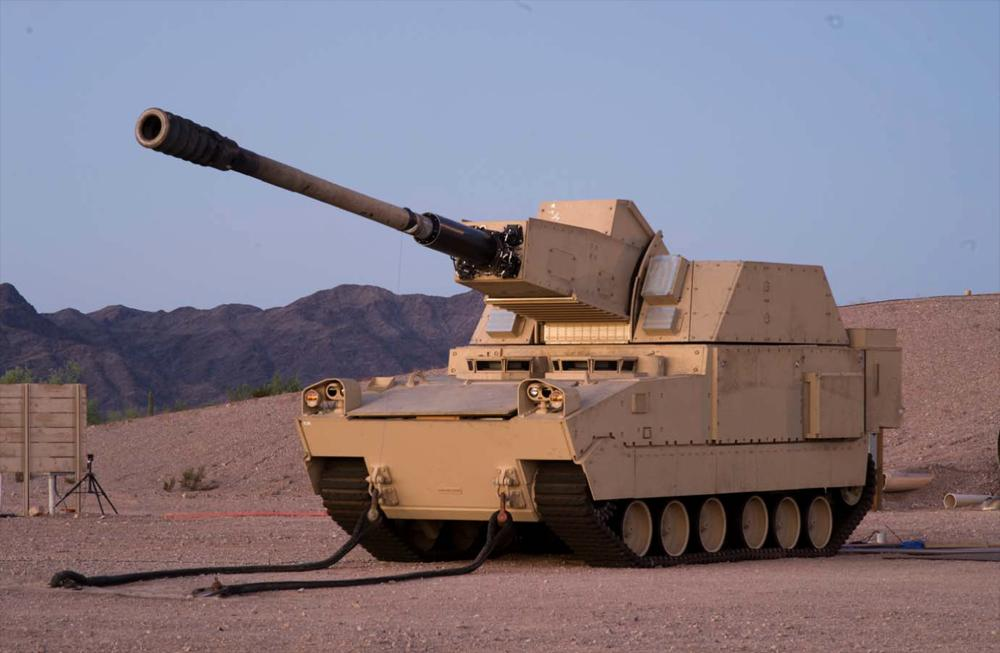
XM1203 NLOS-C prototype in 2009

== See also ==
- Future Combat Systems Manned Ground Vehicles
- Future Force Unit of Action
- List of U.S. military vehicles by model number
- United States Army Simulation and Training Technology Center
- ASM Program (cancelled due to the end of the Cold War)
