= Nitroguanidine =

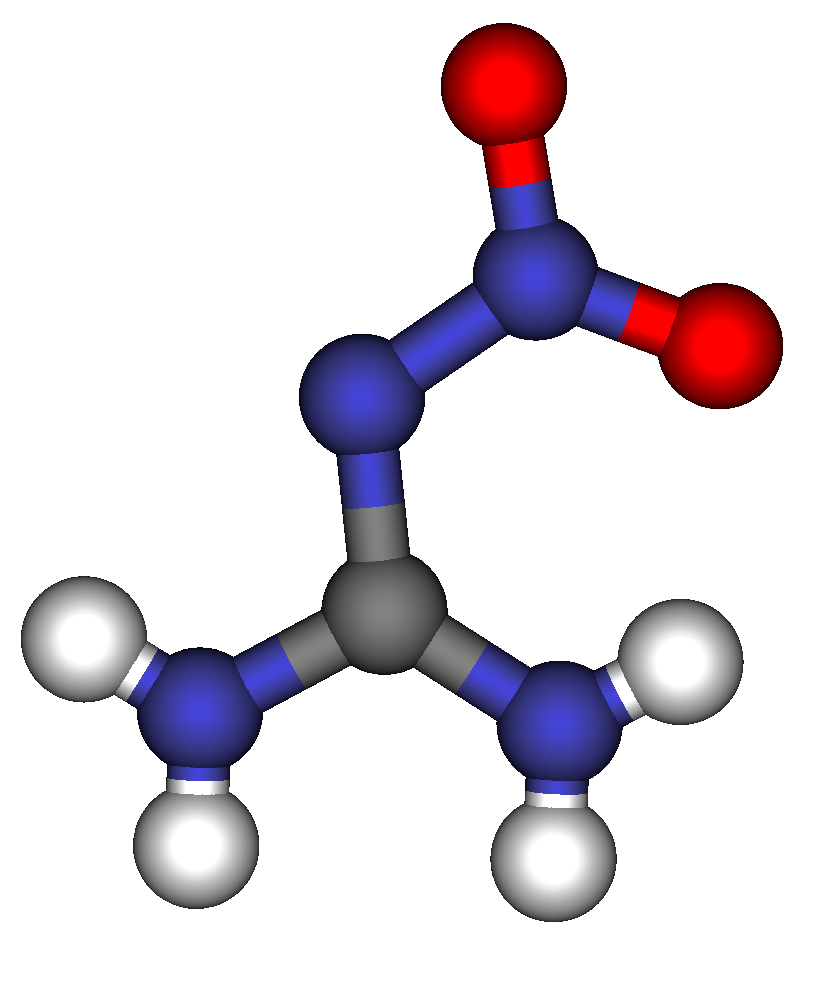

Names
- Preferred IUPAC name N′′-Nitroguanidine
- Other names Picrite

Identifiers
CAS Number	556-88-7
3D model (JSmol)	Interactive image
Beilstein Reference	03, 126
ChEBI	CHEBI:39180
ChemSpider	10701
ECHA InfoCard	100.008.313
PubChem CID	11174
RTECS number	MF4600000
UNII	NAY6KWL67F
CompTox Dashboard (EPA)	DTXSID4024222
- InChI: InChI=1S/CH4N4O2/c2-1(3)4-5(6)7/h(H4,2,3,4) Key: IDCPFAYURAQKDZ-UHFFFAOYSA-N; InChI=1/CH4N4O2/c2-1(3)4-5(6)7/h(H4,2,3,4) Key: IDCPFAYURAQKDZ-UHFFFAOYAN
- SMILES: NC(N)=N[N+]([O-])=O

Properties
Chemical formula	(NH_{2})_{2}CNNO_{2}
Molar mass	104.069 g·mol^{−1}
Appearance	Colorless crystalline solid
Density	1.77 g/cm^{3}
Melting point	239 °C (462 °F; 512 K) decomposes
Solubility in water	0.12 g/100mL (0 °C (32 °F; 273 K)); 0.42 g/100mL (25 °C (77 °F; 298 K)); 8.25 g/100mL (100 °C (212 °F; 373 K))
Solubility in Sulfuric acid	10.9 g/100mL (45% H_{2}SO_{4})
Acidity (pK_{a})	12.2 (in 1 M NaCl at 24 °C (75 °F; 297 K))
Basicity (pK_{b})	15

Explosive data
Shock sensitivity	4.4 lb (2 kg) weight, 19 in (47 cm) (Bureau of Mines apparatus); 1 lb (0.45 kg) weight, 26 in (66 cm) (Picatinny Arsenal apparatus); Unaffected - Rifle bullet impact.
Friction sensitivity	Insensitive
Detonation velocity	5,360 m/s (17,600 ft/s) (at specific gravity (sp. gr.) 1); 7,650 m/s (25,100 ft/s) (at sp. gr. 1.5)
RE factor	1.01 (Trauzl test)

Hazards
- Occupational safety and health (OHS/OSH)
Main hazards	Explosive when dry.
- GHS labelling:(Stabilized with 25% water)
Pictograms	(GHS02: Flammable)
Signal word	Danger
Hazard statements	H228
Precautionary statements	P210, P240, P241, P280, P370+P378
NFPA 704 (fire diamond)	2 0 4
Threshold limit value (TLV)	7 mg/m^{3} (TWA)
- Lethal dose or concentration (LD, LC)
LD_{50} (median dose)	10200 mg/kg (oral, rat)

Related compounds
Related compounds	Guanidine; Guanidine nitrate
- Except where otherwise noted, data are given for materials in their standard state (at 25 °C [77 °F], 100 kPa). verify (what is ?) Infobox references

Nitroguanidine - sometimes abbreviated NQ or NGu - is a colorless, crystalline solid that decomposes at 239 °C (462 °F), without melting. Nitroguanidine is an extremely insensitive but powerful high explosive. Nitroguanidine is used as an energetic material (propellant or high explosive), a precursor for insecticides, and for other purposes.

== Manufacture ==
Nitroguanidine is produced worldwide on a large scale starting with the reaction of dicyandiamide (DCD) with ammonium nitrate to afford the salt guanidinium nitrate, which is then nitrated by treatment with concentrated sulfuric acid at low temperature.

[C(NH_{2})_{3}]NO_{3} → (NH_{2})_{2}CNNO_{2} + H_{2}O

The guanidinium nitrate intermediate may also be produced via the Boatright–Mackay–Roberts (BMR) process, in which molten urea is reacted with molten ammonium nitrate in the presence of silica gel. This process had been commercialized because of its attractive economic features.

2 NH_{2}CONH_{2} + NH_{4}NO_{3} → [C(NH_{2})_{3}]NO_{3} + 2 NH_{3} + CO_{2}

== Uses ==
=== Explosives ===
Nitroguanidine has been in use since the 1930s as an ingredient in triple-base gun propellants in which it reduces flame temperature, muzzle flash, and erosion of the gun barrel, but preserves chamber pressure due to high nitrogen content. Its extreme insensitivity combined with low cost has made it a popular ingredient in insensitive high explosive formulations (e.g AFX-453, AFX-760, IMX-101, AL-IMX-101, IMX-103, etc.).

The first triple-base propellant, featuring 20-25% of nitroguanidine and 30-45% nitroglycerine, was developed at the Dynami Nobel factory at Avigliana and patented by its director Dr. Modesto Abelli (1859-1911) in 1905.

One form of nitroguanidine's explosive decomposition may be given by the following idealized equation, which assumes it decomposes into carbon dioxide, nitrogen gas, and ammonia:

3 O_{2}N−N=C(NH_{2})_{2} → 3 CO_{2} + 4 N_{2} + 4 NH_{3}

However, practical reactions are likely to differ. For example, carbon monoxide and steam can be produced in anoxic conditions:

2 O_{2}N−N=C(NH_{2})_{2} → 2 CO + 4 N_{2} + 2 H_{2}O

In the presence of an additional source of oxygen, steam can also be produced:

O_{2}N−N=C(NH_{2})_{2} + O_{2} → CO_{2} + 2 N_{2} + 2 H_{2}O

=== Pesticides ===
Nitroguanidine derivatives are used as insecticides, having a comparable effect to nicotine. Derivatives include clothianidin, dinotefuran, imidacloprid, and thiamethoxam.

== Structure ==
It has been confirmed by NMR spectroscopy, and both x-ray and neutron diffraction that nitroguanidine exclusively exists as the nitroimine tautomer both in solid state and solution.

== Related compounds ==
The methylated and nitrosylated derivative methylnitronitrosoguanidine is used to mutagenize bacterial cells for biochemical studies.
