= BCT modernization =

BCT modernization logo

The brigade combat team (BCT) modernization was the United States Army's principal modernization program for Brigade Combat Teams (BCTs) from 2009–10. The program is the successor to Future Combat Systems (FCS) which was the modernization program from 2003 to early 2009. The Army BCT Modernization strategy planned to build a versatile mix of tailorable, networked BCTs operating on a rotational scale that would have leveraged mobility, protection, information and precision fires to conduct effective operations to succeed in current and future full spectrum military operations.

A key goal for modernizing the Army BCTs was to enable soldiers with increased intelligence, surveillance, and reconnaissance (ISR) capabilities. Rather than making one modernization decision and then applying it across the Army over two or more decades as has been typical for the US Army in the past, the BCT modernization plan aimed to implement modernization decisions incrementally in order to stay ahead of the demands of the security environment and the needs of US soldiers.
