= M7 Spider =

Munitions system

The M7 Spider is a networked United States anti-personnel munitions system that provides a secure remote command and control capability of up to 1500 meters for a hand-emplaced munition field. The system was developed by Alliant Techsystems (ATK) with its joint venture partner Textron Systems as a part of the Non-Self-Destruct Alternative (NSD-A) program and is intended to replace the Matrix remote trigger system deployed in Iraq which works with pre-existing mines like the M18 Claymore. Day & Zimmermann and General Dynamics are prime subcontractors.

== Design ==
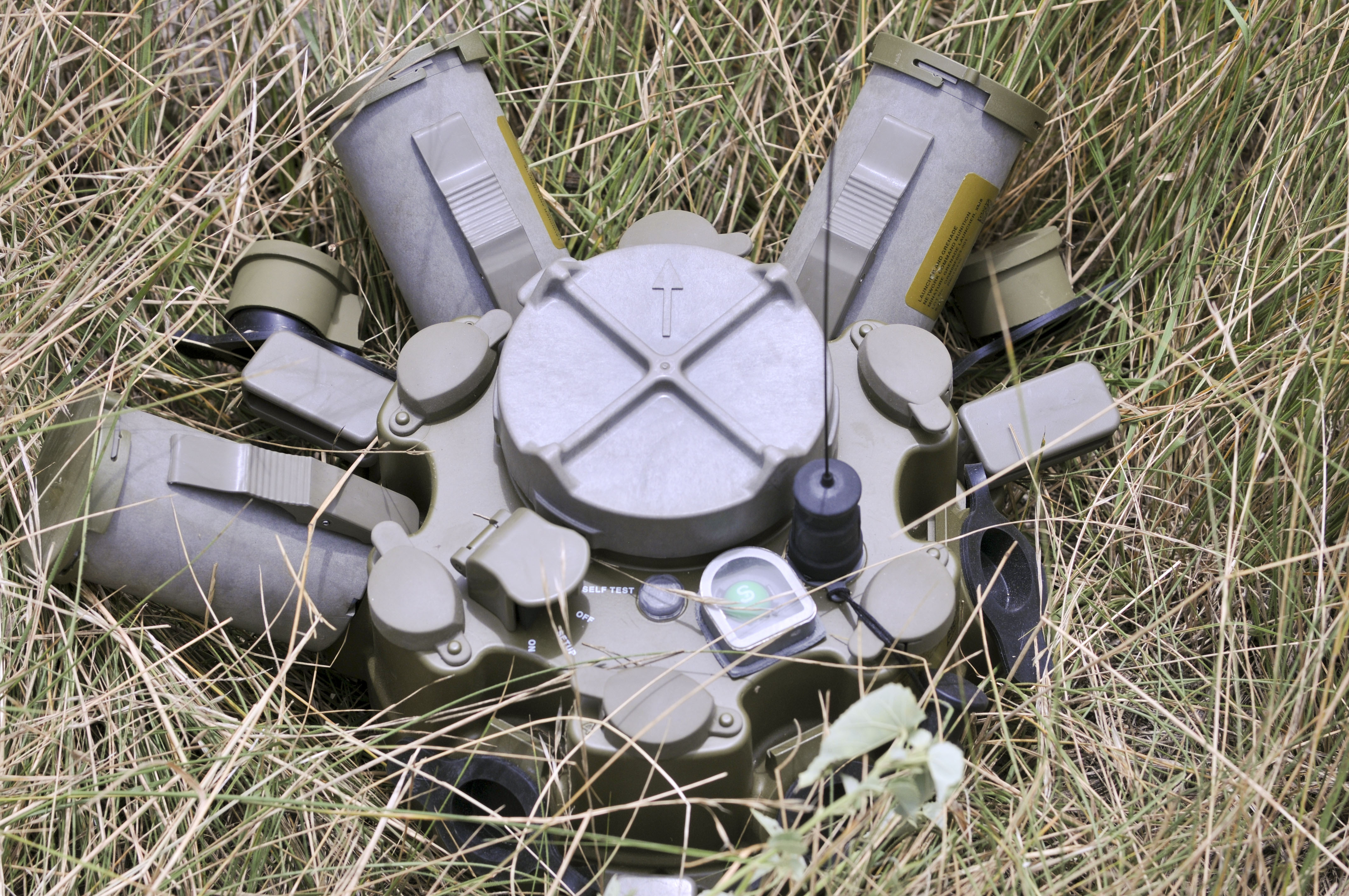
M7 Spider MCU with 3 MGLs

The system is composed of Munition Control Units (MCUs), a Remote Control Station (RCS), and a repeater for extending the communication range. Up to 63 MCUs can be configured for each RCS. Each MCU can attach up to six Miniature Grenade Launchers (MGL) each of which covers a sixty-degree arc. The MCUs are hand emplaced after which the operator can optionally command to deploy six triplines to provide a sensing network. The operator can be situated up to a mile away from the munition or further with the use of a repeater. When a tripline is activated, the MCU connected to the line signals wirelessly to the Remote Control Station using either the U.S. Army battlefield key management infrastructure or the Navy Electronic Key Management System (EKMS). The operator at the RCS can at that point choose to fire one or more of the attached munitions (grenades or other.)

The M-7 Spider can also be ordered to "zeroize", and purge all data stored in its memory to prevent the systems from being removed by the enemy. Additionally, if the system is tampered with or transported while armed it will become disabled. The M7 Spider does not have the ability to self-destruct (although it can be command destructed by the operator) or become a victim-activated mine.

== History ==
Developed to bridge the gap between remote battlefield sensors and anti-personnel mines, the M7 Spider Networked Munition System was originally designed to be either victim-activated or operator-initiated. In accordance with the 2004 U. S. National Landmine Policy, The M7 Spider was permanently configured as a "Man-In-The-Loop" (MITL) weapon system with all victim activated capabilities removed.

Wired reported in 2004 that the Army intended to purchase 290,000 spider munitions at a cost of $513 million US dollars.
