= M101 howitzer =

US-made towed howitzer

M101 105mm light howitzer, towed
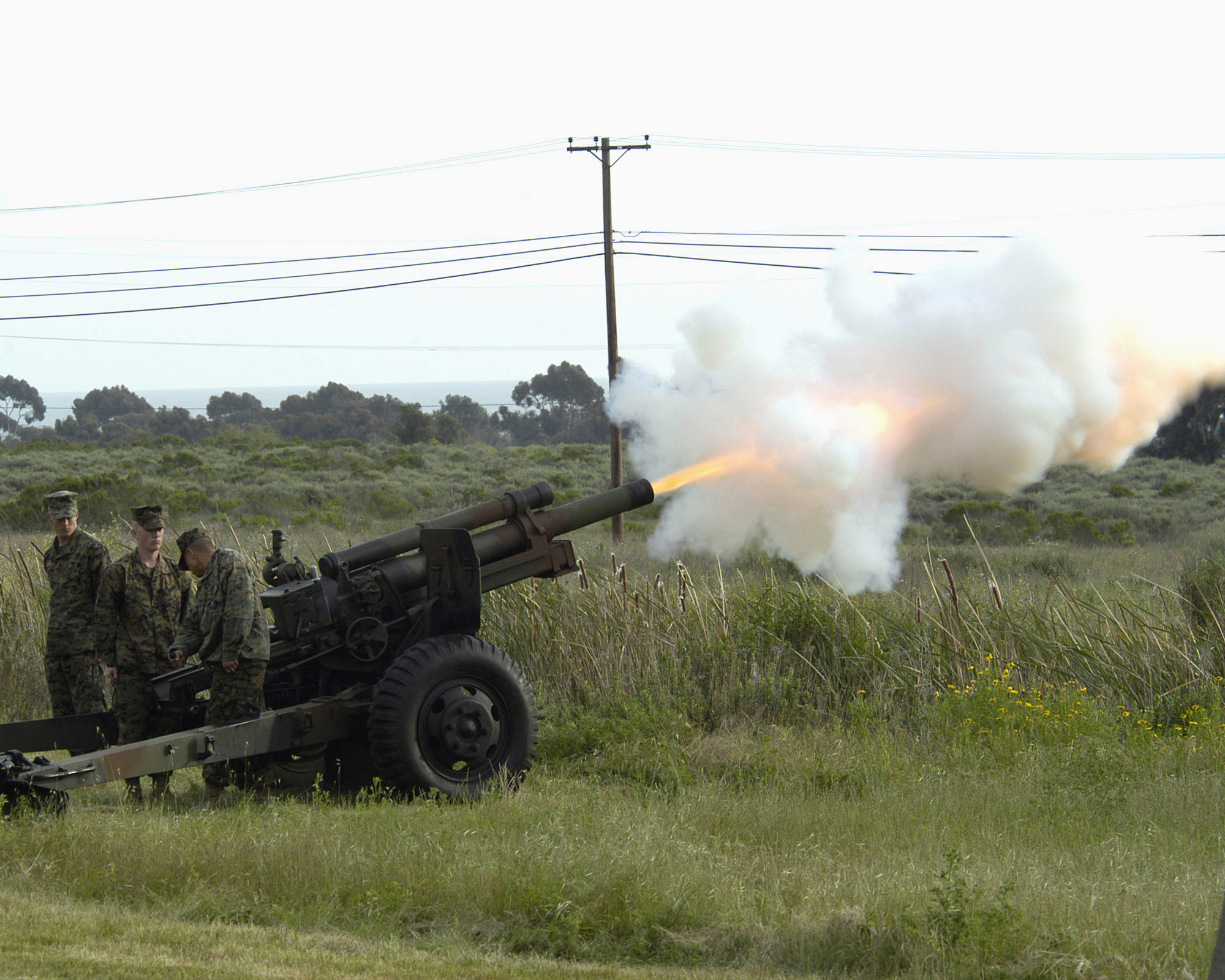
- United States Marines fire a M101A1 during a ceremony in 2005.
- Type: Howitzer
- Place of origin: United States

Service history
- In service: 1941–present
- Wars: List of Conflicts: World War II; Chinese Civil War; Korean War; First Indochina War; Vietnam War; Cambodian Civil War; Laotian Civil War; Football War; Insurgency in the Philippines; Rhodesian Bush War; Iran–Iraq War; Lebanese Civil War; Nicaraguan Revolution; Salvadoran Civil War; Yugoslav Wars; Battle of Marawi; Russo-Ukrainian War; Yemeni Civil War; Russo-Ukrainian war (2022–present); 2025 Cambodia-Thailand conflict

Production history
- Manufacturer: Rock Island Arsenal; Kia Machine Tool; Sorel industries (Canadian C3)
- Produced: 1941–1953
- No. built: 10,200

Specifications
- Mass: 4,980 lb (2,260 kg)
- Length: 19 ft 6 in (5.94 m)
- Barrel length: 7 ft 7 in (2.31 m) L/22
- Width: 7 ft 3 in (2.21 m)
- Height: 5 ft 8 in (1.73 m)
- Shell: 105×372 mm R
- Caliber: 105 mm (4.1 in)
- Breech: Horizontal-block
- Recoil: Hydro-pneumatic, constant, 42 in (110 cm)
- Carriage: split trail
- Elevation: −5° (−89 mils) to 65° (1,156 mils)
- Traverse: ±23° (±409 mils)
- Muzzle velocity: 1,550 ft/s (472 m/s)
- Maximum firing range: 7.00 mi (11,270 m)

The M101A1 (previously designated Howitzer M2A2 on Carriage M2A2) howitzer is an artillery piece developed and used by the United States. It was the standard U.S. light field howitzer in World War II and saw action in both the European and Pacific theaters and during the Korean War. Entering production in 1941, it quickly gained a reputation for accuracy and a powerful punch. The M101A1 fires 105 mm high explosive (HE) semi-fixed ammunition and has a range of 12,330 yards (11,270 m) or 7 miles, making it suitable for supporting infantry.

== Development History ==
=== Early stage ===
"Weapons Of The Field Artillery" (1953) - Official United States Army artillery training information reel.

After World War I, the U.S. Army Ordnance Department studied various captured German 105 mm-caliber howitzers and developed the 105 mm Howitzer M1920 by using the Carriage M1920. A box trail carriage design (the M1925E carriage) and two other split trail designs (the T1 and T2) were also developed, but the original split trail design was found superior after testing. After being selected, the piece was standardized in December 1927 as the 105 mm howitzer M1 on carriage M1. The Army intended to replace all 75 mm guns in its divisional and non-divisional field artillery regiments with 105 mm pieces, but a lack of appropriations stalled the idea and eventually forced it to be completely abandoned by 1929; a limited plan developed in 1925 envisioned re-equipping three regiments, but by 1933, only 14 M1 howitzers had been manufactured.

A modified version of the M1, which was trialed in 1932, used semi-fixed ammunition instead of separate-loading ammunition. Since this development required a different breech block, the new piece was designated the 105 mm howitzer M2 on carriage M1. 48 pieces were manufactured in 1939. The original M1 carriage had been designed for towing using horses rather than trucks, and a new carriage, the T5 (M2), was developed in 1939 and standardized in February 1940. The breech ring of the howitzer M2 was modified in March 1940 before large-scale production began, creating the 105 mm howitzer M2A1 on carriage M2.

In 1939, the new howitzer cost $25,000, which was three times as much as the modernisation cost of a 75 mm field gun M1897 on M2 carriage, and its adoption required procurement of a colossal amount of new ammunition (War Department estimate of $26 million).

Small-scale production of the M2A1 began in April 1941, with 25 pieces, followed by 18 each in May and June. Production began to ramp up in August, and production for the year totaled 604 pieces.

=== World War II ===
3,325 pieces were built in 1942, 2,684 in 1943, 1,200 in 1944, and 730 up to and including August 1945. The gun was designed to be very durable and was therefore heavy for its caliber, but studies after 1943 found that, after prolonged firing, the muzzle end of the barrel was prone to cracking. To relieve stress in the barrel, new production M2A1 tubes were counterbored two inches from the muzzle starting in the late 1940s. By the end of World War II, 8,543 105 mm towed howitzers had been built.

=== Cold War ===
Post-war production continued at Rock Island Arsenal until 1953, by which time 10,202 had been built. In 1953, the new howitzer M2A2 was standardized to further increase the life of the howitzer at the cost of some muzzle velocity. The M2A2's barrel had a higher strength breech ring, deeper rifling grooves, and shallower rifling taper than the M2A1's barrel, resulting in a 50 percent more effective full charge barrel life than the M2A1.

"Weapons of the Field Artillery" (1966).

A further development, the M2A2E2, featuring a muzzle brake and with its maximal range increased along with the propelling charge, on carriage M2A2E2, featuring an increased maximal angle of fire, was designed and tested in 1958, but with the coming XM102 howitzer both were canceled in 1961.

In November 1960, the U.S. military artillery designation system began to change; howitzers M2A1 or M2A2 on carriage M2A1 were renamed M101s, while howitzers M2A1 or M2A2 on carriage M2A2 were renamed M101A1s. These models continued to see service through the Vietnam War. Though the successor M102 howitzer was adopted in 1964, both the M101 and M102 shared similar roles in battle and the M101A1 was never fully replaced in front-line service until the adoption of the M119 howitzer. Today, the M101A1 has been retired by the U.S. military, although it is still retained for ceremonial purposes. Abroad, it continues to see service with many other countries.

== Users ==
=== Australia ===
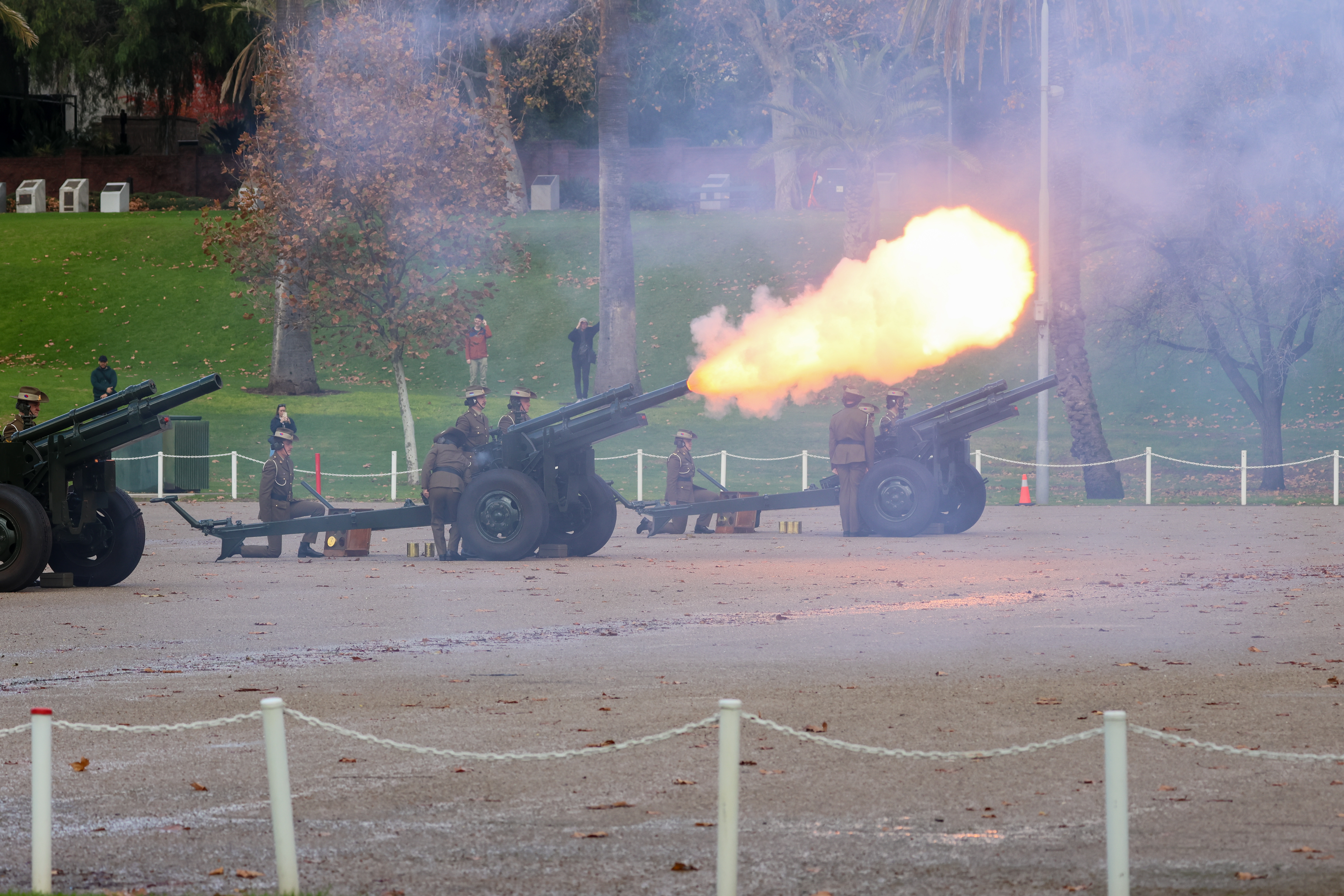
21-gun salute at the Torrens Parade Ground celebrating the King's Birthday

The M2A2 howitzer was retired from regular service with the Australian Army in 1988, when it was replaced by the 105 mm L118 and L119, which in turn were replaced by the M777A2 in 2014. The M2A2 remained in service with the Australian Army Reserve until its replacement by 81-millimetre (3.2 in) mortars in the late 2000s. Australia's Federation Guard retains six pieces for ceremonial use.

=== Canada ===
The Canadian Forces procured at least 60 US made M2A1 howitzers, beginning in 1952, and also had Sorel Industries of Canada produce 232 of a slightly modified M2A2 version, starting in 1955. The Canadian produced guns were later designated C1, while the US produced guns were designated C2. These continued in service until the early 2000s. In the late 1990s, ninety-six C1 guns were selected and sent to RDM in the Netherlands to extend their service life. These guns were re-designated as the C3. The changes include a longer 33-calibre barrel, a muzzle brake, reinforced trails and the removal of shield flaps. It remains the standard light howitzer of Canadian Forces Reserve units. The C3 is used by 1RCHA in Glacier National Park in British Columbia as a means of avalanche control. The modified 105mm C3 howitzer has a range of 18km.

=== China ===
In 1942, the Nationalist Government of the Republic of China planned to acquire 360 units of 105mm M2A1 howitzers from the United States to modernize 30 army divisions. The U.S. government subsequently provided 218 units in late 1942 and an additional 258 units in 1943. Deliveries accelerated following the opening of the Ledo and Burma Road in February 1945. Following World War II, the Chinese Communist Forces captured large quantities of these howitzers during the Chinese Civil War, using them against Nationalist forces and later deploying them in the Korean War.

During the Korean War, the Chinese Communist Forces operated M2A1 howitzers as one of standard artillery pieces for independent artillery units subordinate to Army Groups. During the New Year's Offensive in 1951, both the 9th and 13th Army Groups operated an artillery regiment with 36 M2A1 howitzers each. A regiment consisted of three battalions, and each battalion had three batteries with four howitzers and nine trucks for towing and ammunition transport.

During the April 1951 Spring Offensive, at least 117 M2A1 howitzers were used. However, following the offensive, the total inventory increased to 230 pieces. According to a report by Lieutenant General Razuvayev, head of the Soviet military advisory group, during the first half of 1951, North Korean and Chinese Communist forces repaired and deployed numerous captured heavy equipment pieces, including howitzers, to frontline units.

From late May 1951 onward, as the nature of operations shifted toward trench and hill warfare, the usage of M2A1 howitzers—which offered superior high-explosive (HE) firepower and longer range compared to the Soviet 76 mm divisional gun M1942 (ZiS-3)—increased. Analysis of communist artillery bombardment patterns conducted by the U.S. I Corps in September 1951 revealed that the M2A1 was the artillery piece fired most frequently by communist forces. During the Battle of Triangle Hill in 1952, the 28th Artillery Regiment of the 2nd Artillery Division was deployed equipped with M2A1 howitzers. In the Battle of Kumsong in July 1953—the final offensive operation of the Chinese Communist Forces—the 20th Army Group deployed 84 M2A1 howitzers and fired a total of 6,682 rounds.

=== Croatia ===
A number of M2/M101 howitzers were used by the Socialist Federal Republic of Yugoslavia and approximately 50 were inherited by Croatia, of which four are still in use for training with the Croatian Army.

=== France ===
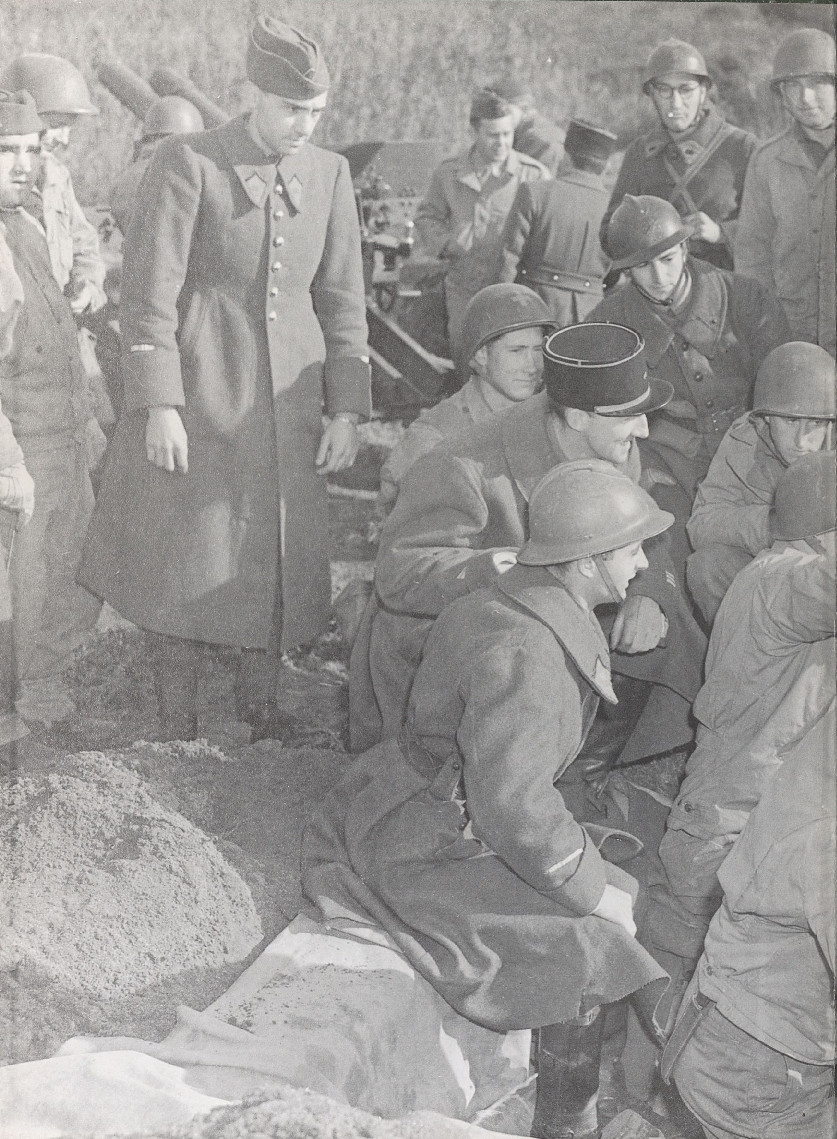
French artillerymen of the 65th Artillery Regiment being instructed on 105mm M2 Howitzer in Morocco, December 1943.

The French Army used the M2 howitzer, designated HM2, during World War II, in the Algerian War and during the Opération Tacaud in Chad. France later supplied a battery of HM2 to the Rwandan Armed Forces during the Rwandan Civil War that led into the Rwandan genocide.

=== Germany ===
The German Army adopted the M101 howitzer in a modified form in March 1956, designated Feldhaubitze 105 mm M1A2 (Bw). Using components made by Rheinmetall, the new howitzers had a longer, un-counterbored 27-caliber barrel, a large single-baffle muzzle brake, and a larger gun shield.

=== Philippines ===
M2A1 howitzers were used by the PEFTOK. By the 1980s, these wartime artillery pieces were replaced by M101s, and were used against the NPA and the MNLF, and the MILF. Several M101 howitzers are still in use with the Armed Forces of the Philippines and are normally used to battle rebels in Luzon, Visayas, and Mindanao. They were also used in direct fire against Islamic militants during the Battle of Marawi.

=== South Korea ===
Starting on 6 July 1950, South Korea received a total of 1,127 M2A1s until the end of the Korean War to supplement and replace the M1 75 mm howitzer and the M3 105 mm howitzer.

In the early 1970s, the ROK Armed Forces needed to replace these old howitzers due to the maintenance burden. To match North Korea's artillery capability, South Korea invested in the domestic arms industry to equip its large military cost efficiently. After completion of Project Lightning I, supported by the U.S. Department of Defense, for infantry weapons, in April 1972, the South Korean president Park Chung Hee ordered Project Lightning II for artillery weapons. The U.S. refused to cooperate due to the then diplomatic overtures to the People's Republic of China. The U.S. Embassy in South Korea ordered its technical team to withdraw, believing that South Korea lacked the tooling and knowledge to develop the weapons by itself. The Agency for Defense Development however, reverse engineered the M2A1 (M101A1), and prototype production began in March 1973.

On 25 June 1973, three prototypes were demonstrated publicly. After the test, the U.S. ambassador Philip Habib arranged the meeting of South Korean chief secretary O Won-cheol and colonel Montgomery from the Joint U.S. Military Affairs Group-Korea. The colonel provided technical review of the howitzer, and recommended purchasing of the U.S. equipment for logistics issues because the howitzer was not compatible with the U.S. standard. South Korea refused and pursued domestic design, but the two nations eventually signed an agreement for technology transfer in September 1973. It was the first weapons research cooperation between the two nations, and the South Korean defense industry began to form with guidance from the U.S.

In February 1974, hostilities grew after North Korea sunk a South Korean fishing boat and kidnapped fishermen near Baengnyeong Island. As a response, 10 howitzers crafted prior to the research cooperation were sent to the island, but pulled out after having severe malfunctions during operations. In November 1975, the reinforced variant experienced barrel breakdown; the failure led to the invitation of American engineers in January 1976 for an overview. After 1.5 months of inspection, the engineers suggested the Eighth United States Army replace South Korean copy with the original M101A1 design. The U.S. then provided its technical data package to South Korea, which quickly readied mass production of the howitzer before the year ended. Production began in 1977 as KM101A1 by Kia Machine Tool (now Hyundai Wia) in Changwon.

In 1978, South Korea restarted a domestic howitzer program based on the M101A1. The KH178 barrel was extended to a length of 38 calibers, which extended the maximum range to 18 km using RAP ammunition. Only 18 howitzers saw service with the South Korean military, which preferred mass producing KH179 155 mm towed howitzer.

As of 2021, South Korea is the largest operator of the M101 howitzer with about 2,000 pieces in active service. It is planned to convert a third of its inventory to K105A1 self-propelled howitzers.

=== Vietnam ===
France and the State of Vietnam used M2A1 howitzers during the First Indochina War, as did the Viet Minh guerilla forces they fought against, who were supplied with at least 24 by the People's Republic of China, along with other captured American artillery pieces and mortars formerly operated by both Nationalist Chinese forces (the Kuomintang military) and US troops fighting in Korea.

Some howitzers were also supplied by the US to the Army of the Republic of Vietnam during the Vietnam War. As of 2026, they are still used by the People's Army of Vietnam. They are also utilized as the mainline ceremonial cannons for state-level occasions and celebrations.

=== Other uses ===
In addition, the M101 has found a second use in the U.S. as an avalanche control gun, supervised by the US Forest Service and the US Army TACOM's cooperative effort in the Avalanche Artillery Users of North America Committee (AAUNAC). The M101 is used by a number of ski areas and state departments of transportation for long-range control work. Under the designation of M2A2, the 2nd Battalion, 2nd Field Artillery Regiment, 428th Field Artillery Brigade performs salutes with 7 guns with World War II Medal of Honor recipient names on their barrels.

== Variants ==
Gun variants:

- M1920 – prototype.
- M1925E – prototype.
- T2 – prototype, standardized as M1.
- M2 (1934) – minor changes to the chamber to allow the use of fixed ammunition.
- M2A1 (1940) – modified breech ring.
- M2A2 (1953) – deeper rifling and shorter rifling taper.
- M2A2E2 (1958) – prototype with muzzle brake.
- M3 – lightweight howitzer, with barrel shortened by 27 inches (69 cm) with carriage of the M1 pack howitzer.
- T8 – prototype vehicle-mounted variant with modified breech and with cylindrical recoil surface, standardized as 105 mm M4 howitzer in September, 1943.
- FH M1A2 – Rheinmetall-modified M101 in German service.
- M101 – post-1961 designation of M2A1 or M2A2 on carriage M2A1.
- M101A1 – post-1961 designation of M2A1 or M2A2 on carriage M2A2.
- M2A1 – modernized L33 variant by Yugoimport SDPR with max range of 15 km (9.3 mi)/18.1 km (11.2 mi) (boat tail shell/base bleed shell)
- C3 – Canadian C1 (M2A1) with lengthened, 33-caliber barrel
- KM101A1 – South Korean license of M101A1, 1977
- KH178 – South Korean 38 calibers variant, 1983

Carriage variants:

- M1920E – prototype, split trail.
- M1921E – prototype, box trail.
- M1925E – prototype, box trail.
- T2, standardized as M1 – split trail, wooden wheels.
- M1A1 – M1 carriages rebuilt with new wheels, brakes and other parts.
- T3 – prototype.
- T4 – prototype.
- T5, standardized as M2 (1940) – split trail, steel wheels with pneumatic tires.
- M2A1 – electric brakes removed.
- M2A2 – modified shield.
- M2A2E2 – prototype with increased elevation to 70 degrees.
- XM124 & XM124E1 light auxiliary propelled howitzer – prototype (1962–1965) – produced by Sundstrand Aviation Corporation, who added an auxiliary drive system for local maneuverability (See also similar XM123 Medium Auxiliary Propelled 155 mm Howitzer with similar configuration). The base XM124 provided two 20 horsepower (15 kW), air-cooled engines, while the XM124E1 provided a single 20 horsepower (15 kW) engine and electric steering.
- M2A2 Terra Star auxiliary propelled howitzer – prototype (1969–1977) – Lockheed Aircraft Service Company added an auxiliary drive system and a tri-star wheel system to the carriage of an M2A2 105 mm light howitzer to provide local maneuverability. The last surviving example is at the Rock Island Arsenal Museum.
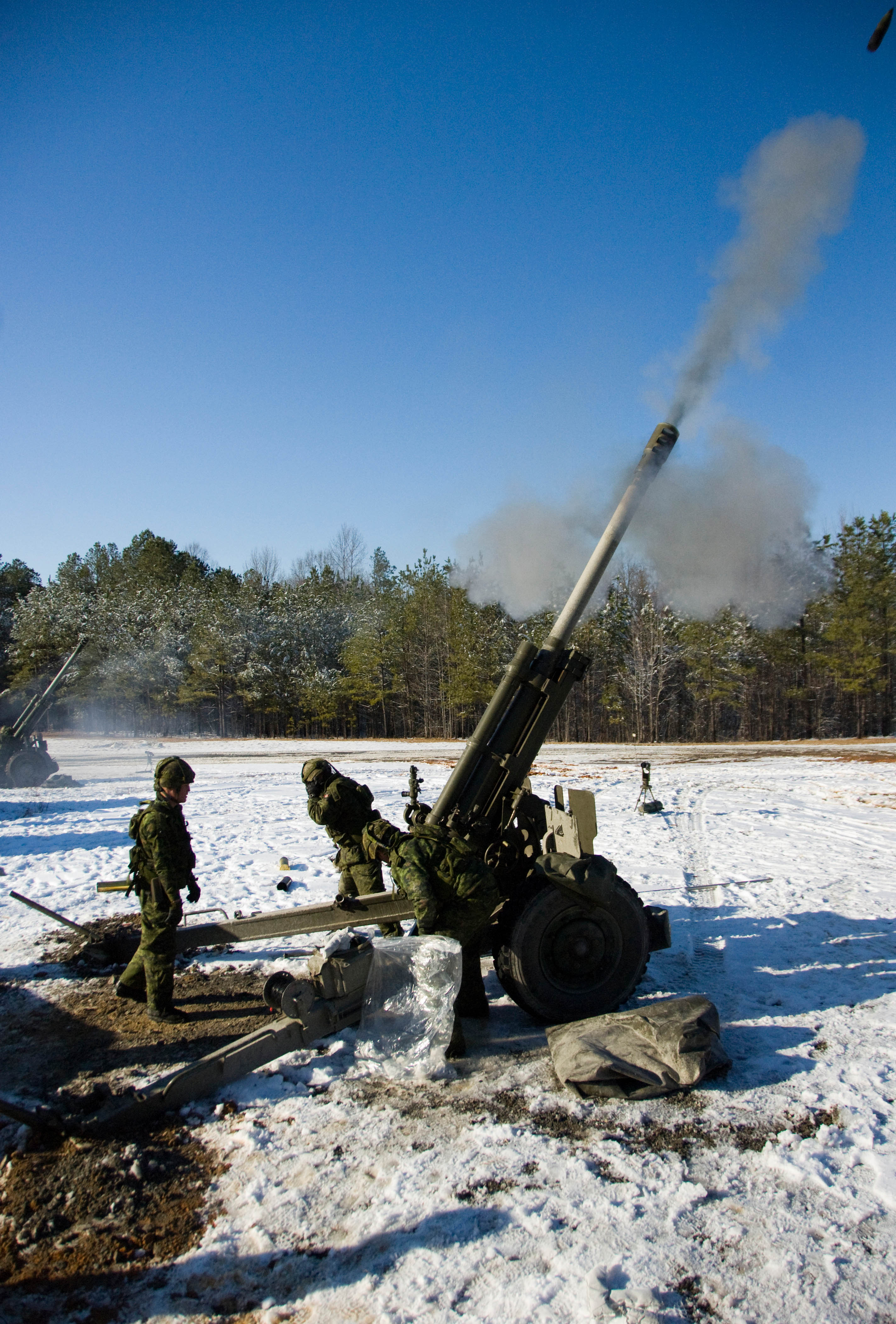
Canadian soldiers fire a high explosive round with a C3 howitzer in 2009.

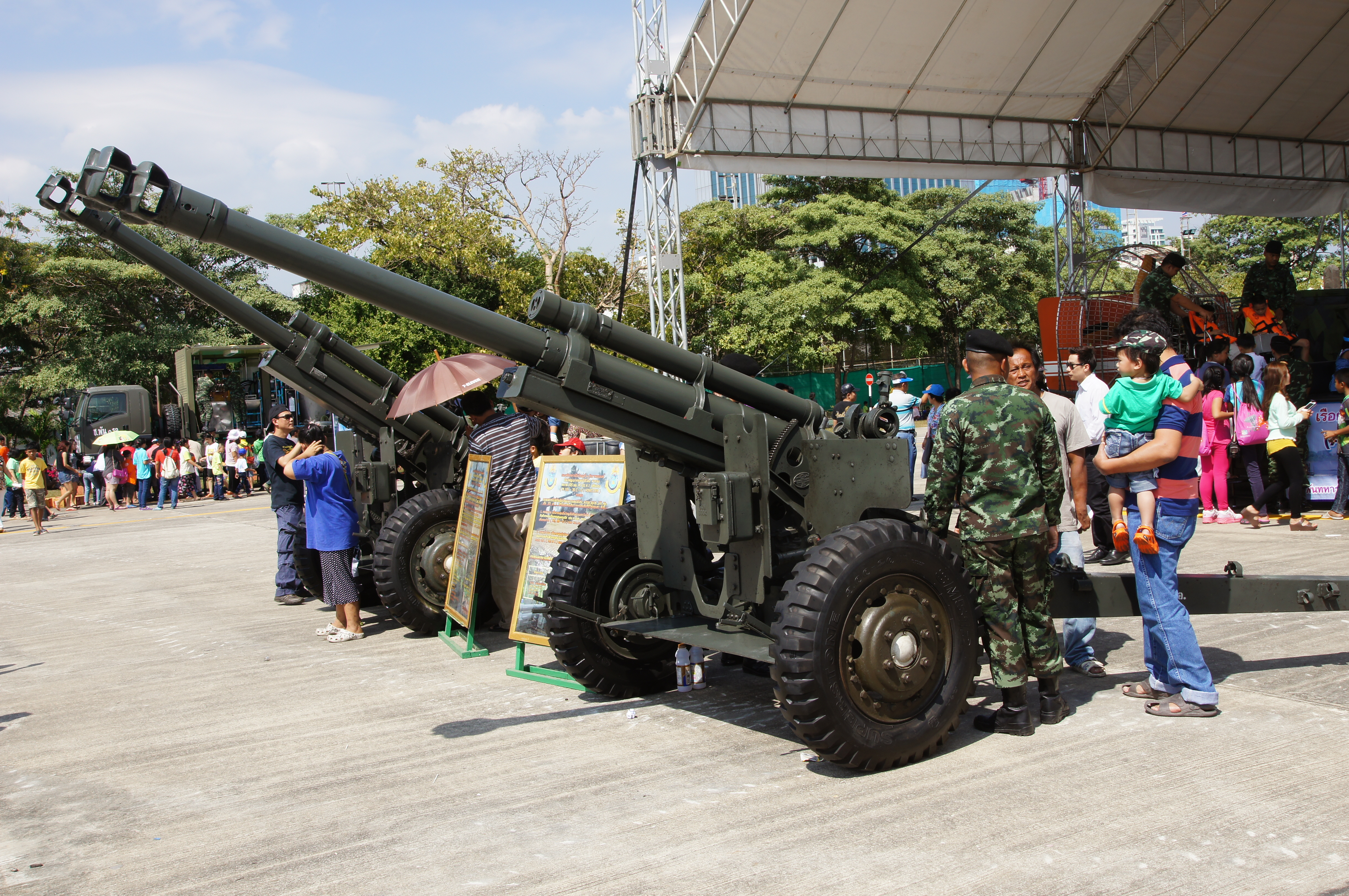
Royal Thai army M101 with new barrel.

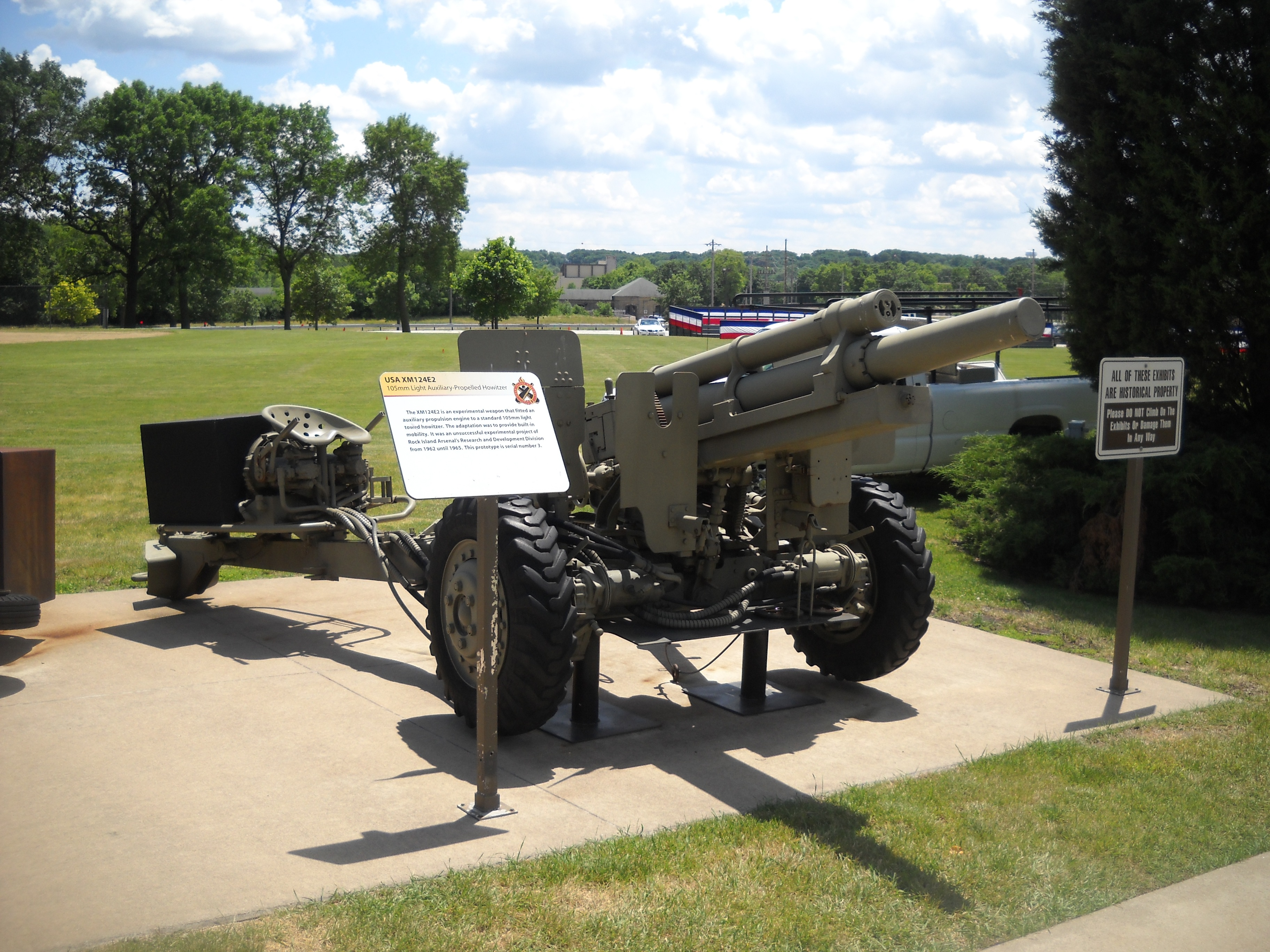
XM124E2 light auxiliary-propelled 105 mm howitzer at the Rock Island Arsenal museum.

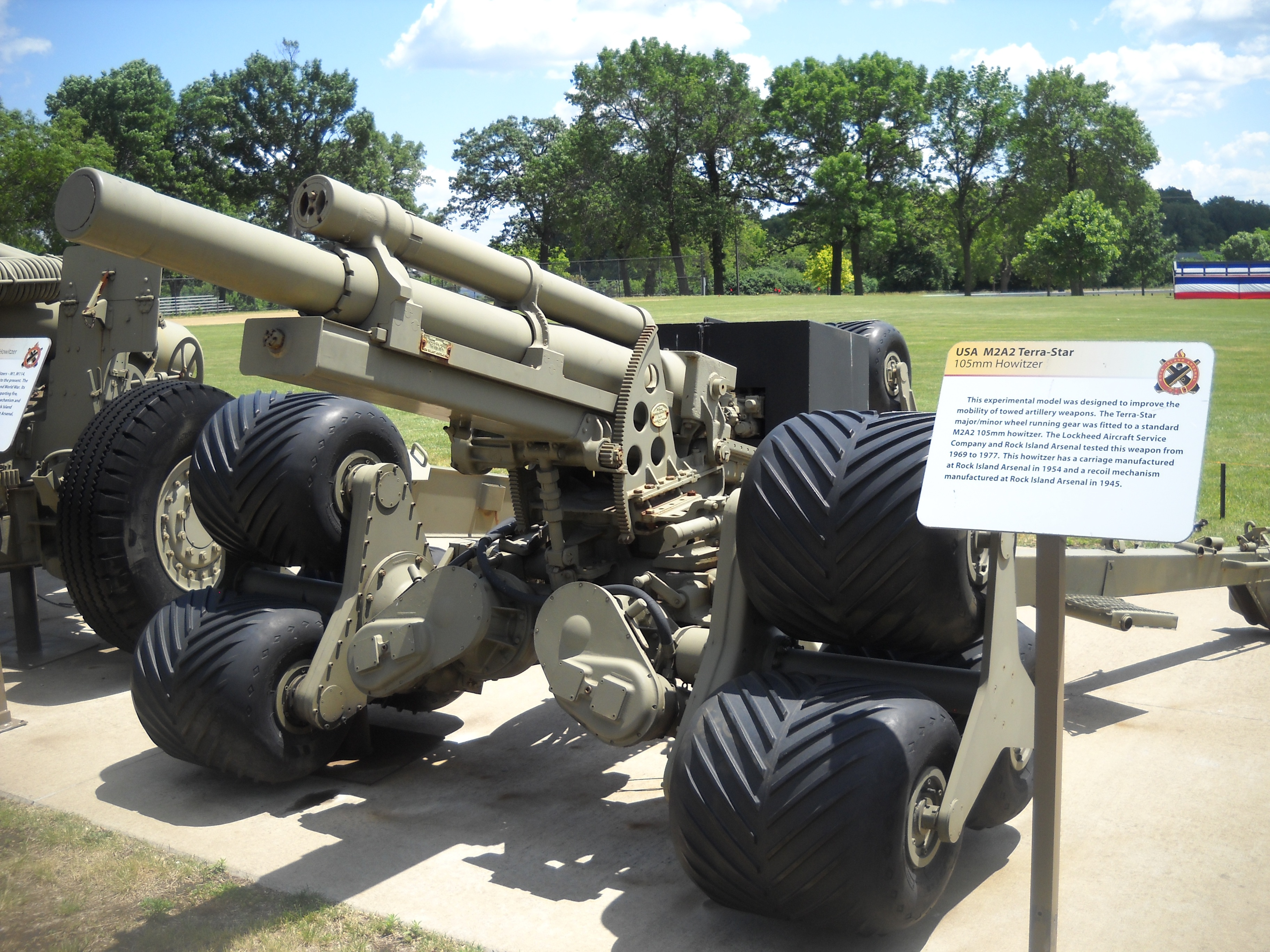
The only surviving prototype M2A2 Terra Star auxiliary propelled howitzer at the Rock Island Arsenal Museum. Note the tri-star wheel system and auxiliary drive system on the right trail leg.

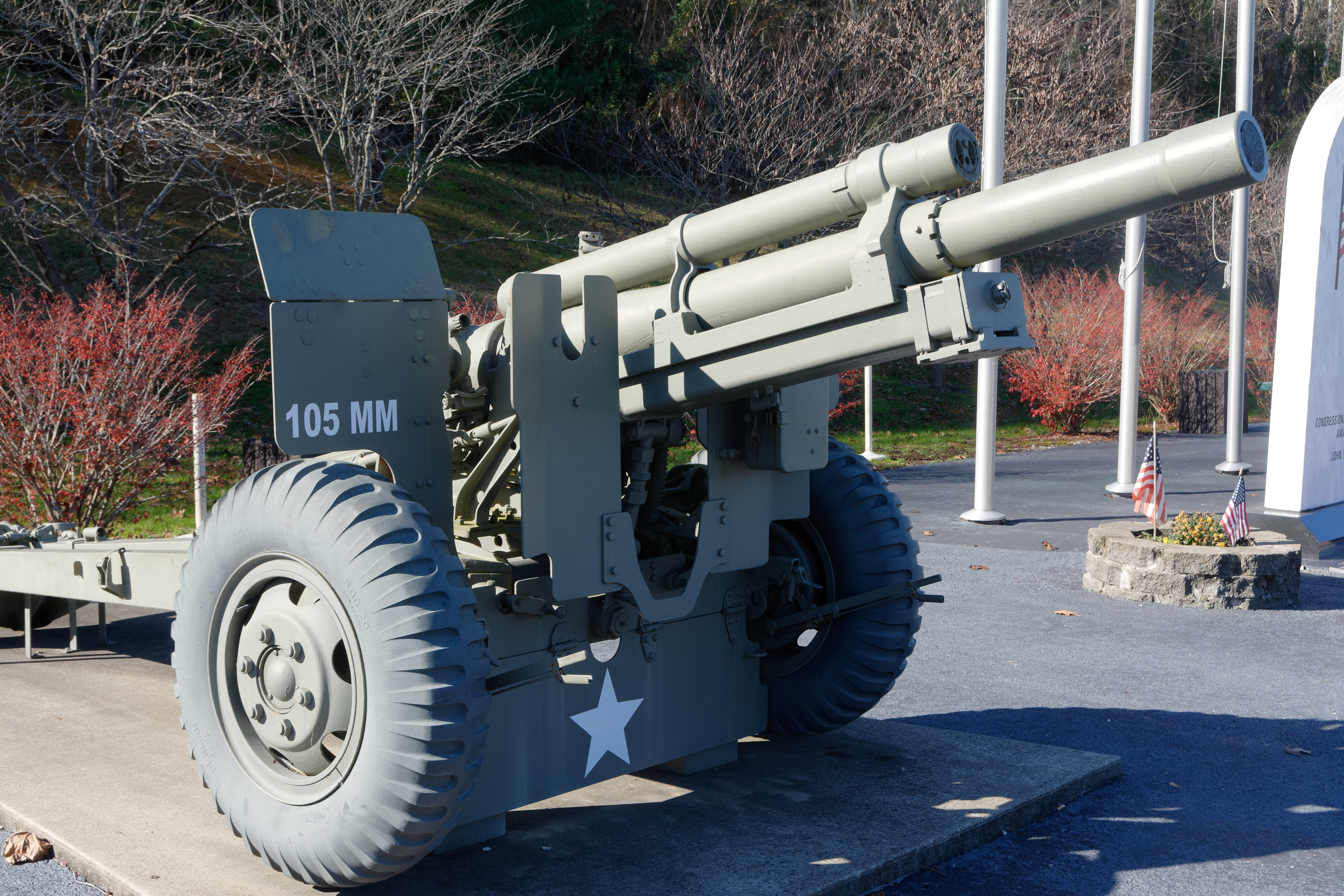
Greenup, Kentucky, US.

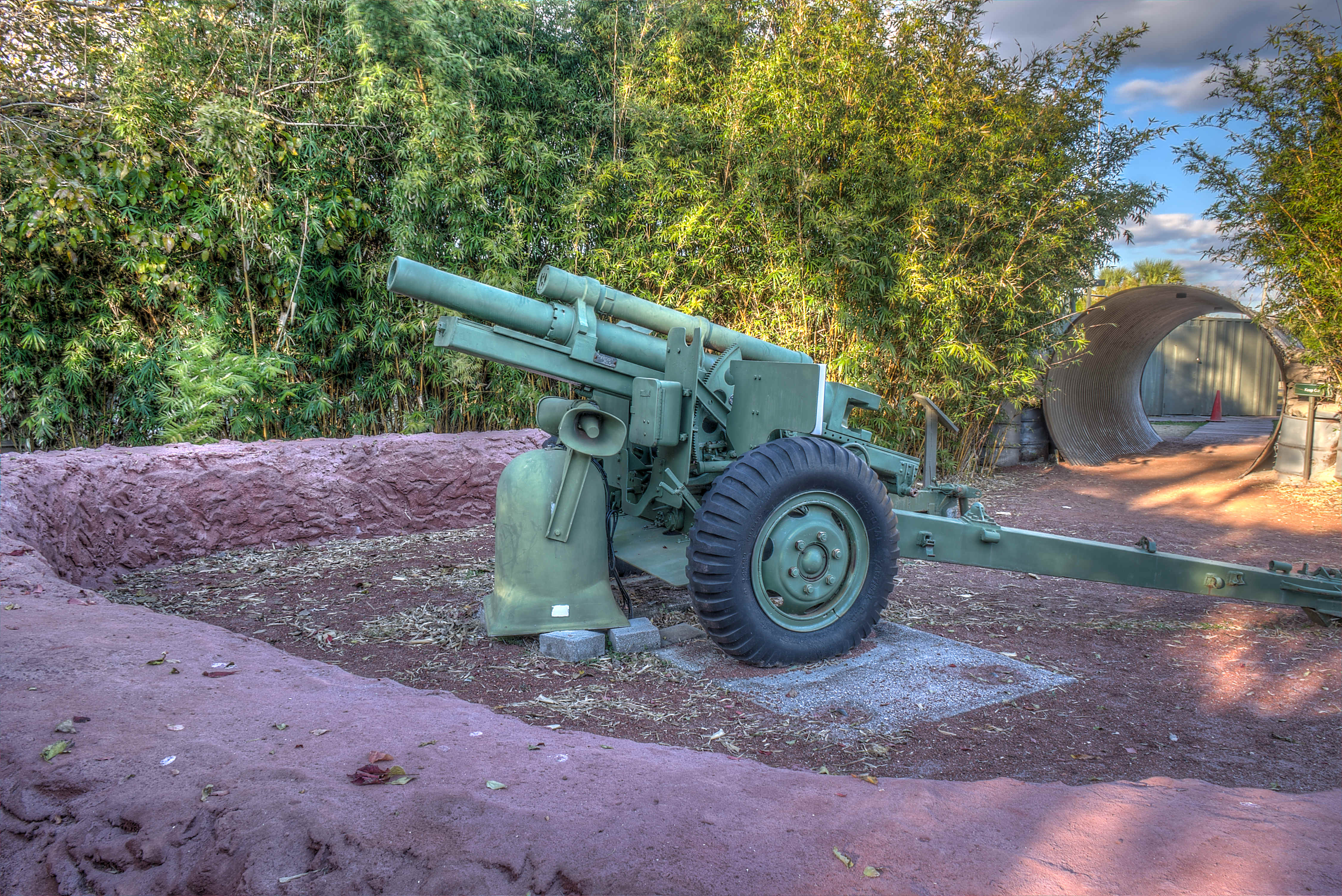
M101 A1 on display at Patriots Point Naval and Maritime Museum.

== Self-propelled mounts ==
- Medium Tank M4A4E1 – M2A1 in mount T70.
- Medium Tank M4(105), M4A3(105) – M4 in mount M52.
- Medium/Heavy Tank M45 – M4 in mount M71.
- Experimental mount on Holt tractor
- Experimental chassis designed by J Walter Christie – M1920.
- 105 mm howitzer motor carriage T9 (based on Cletrac MG-2 tractor).
- 105 mm howitzer motor carriage T19 (based on M3 halftrack) – M2A1.
- 105 mm howitzer motor carriage T32 / M7 – M2A1.
- 105 mm howitzer motor carriage T76 / M37 (Light Tank M24 chassis) – M4 in mount M5.
- 105 mm amphibian gun motor carriage T87 (based on GMC M18 automotive components) – T8
- 105 mm howitzer motor carriage T88 (GMC M18 chassis) – M4 in mount M20.
- K105HT – 105 mm howitzer mounted on an armored 5-ton truck system built by Samsung Techwin for the Republic of Korea Army (initially called EVO-105)
- Vietnamese M101 howitzer mounted on an Ural-375D 6×6 truck.

== Ammunition ==
The gun fired semi-fixed ammunition, with 105 mm Cartridge Case M14. The propelling charge consisted of a base charge and six incremental charges, forming seven charges from 1 (the smallest) to 7 (the largest). Use of M1 HE rounds prepared for the 105 mm howitzer M3 (same projectile and cartridge, but different propelling charge) was authorized.

HEAT M67 Shell was originally designed as fixed round, with Cartridge Case M14 type II. It was later changed to semi-fixed type with the standard cartridge, but with non-adjustable propelling charge. For blank ammunition, a shorter Cartridge Case M15 with black powder charge was used.

Available ammunition
Type	Model	Weight; Complete / Projectile		Filler	Muzzle velocity	Range
HE	HE M1 Shell	19.08 kg (42 lb)	14.97 kg (33 lb)	TNT or 50/50 amatol, 2.18 kg (5 lb)	472 m/s (1,550 ft/s)	11,160 m (36,610 ft)
HEAT	HEAT M67 Shell	16.71 kg (37 lb)	13.25 kg (29 lb)	Pentolite, 1.33 kg (3 lb)	381 m/s (1,250 ft/s)	7,854 m (25,768 ft)
Smoke	HC BE M84 Shell	19.02 kg (42 lb)	14.91 kg (33 lb)	Zinc chloride (HC)	472 m/s (1,550 ft/s)	11,160 m (36,610 ft)
Smoke, colored	BE M84 Shell	17.86–18.04 kg (39–40 lb)		Smoke mixture		
Smoke	WP M60 Shell	19.85 kg (44 lb)	15.56 kg (34 lb)	White phosphorus, 1.84 kg (4 lb)	472 m/s (1,550 ft/s)	11,110 m (36,450 ft)
Smoke	FS M60 Shell	20.09 kg (44 lb)		Sulfur trioxide in chlorosulfonic acid, 2.09 kg (5 lb)		
Chemical	H M60 Shell	19.43 kg (43 lb)		Mustard gas, 1.44 kg (3 lb)		
Practice	Empty M1 Shell				472 m/s (1,550 ft/s)	11,160 m (36,610 ft)
Drill	Drill Cartridge M14				-	-
Blank					-	-

Armor penetration
Ammunition \ Distance	0	457 m (500 yd)	914 m (1,000 yd)	1,828 m (1,999 yd)
HEAT M67 Shell (meet angle 0°)	102–183 mm (4–7 in)			
Concrete penetration
HE M1 Shell (meet angle 0°)	457 mm (1 ft 6 in)	427 mm (1 ft 5 in)	396 mm (1 ft 4 in)	335 mm (1 ft 1 in)
Different methods of measurement were used in different countries / periods. Therefore, direct comparison is often impossible.

== Operators ==
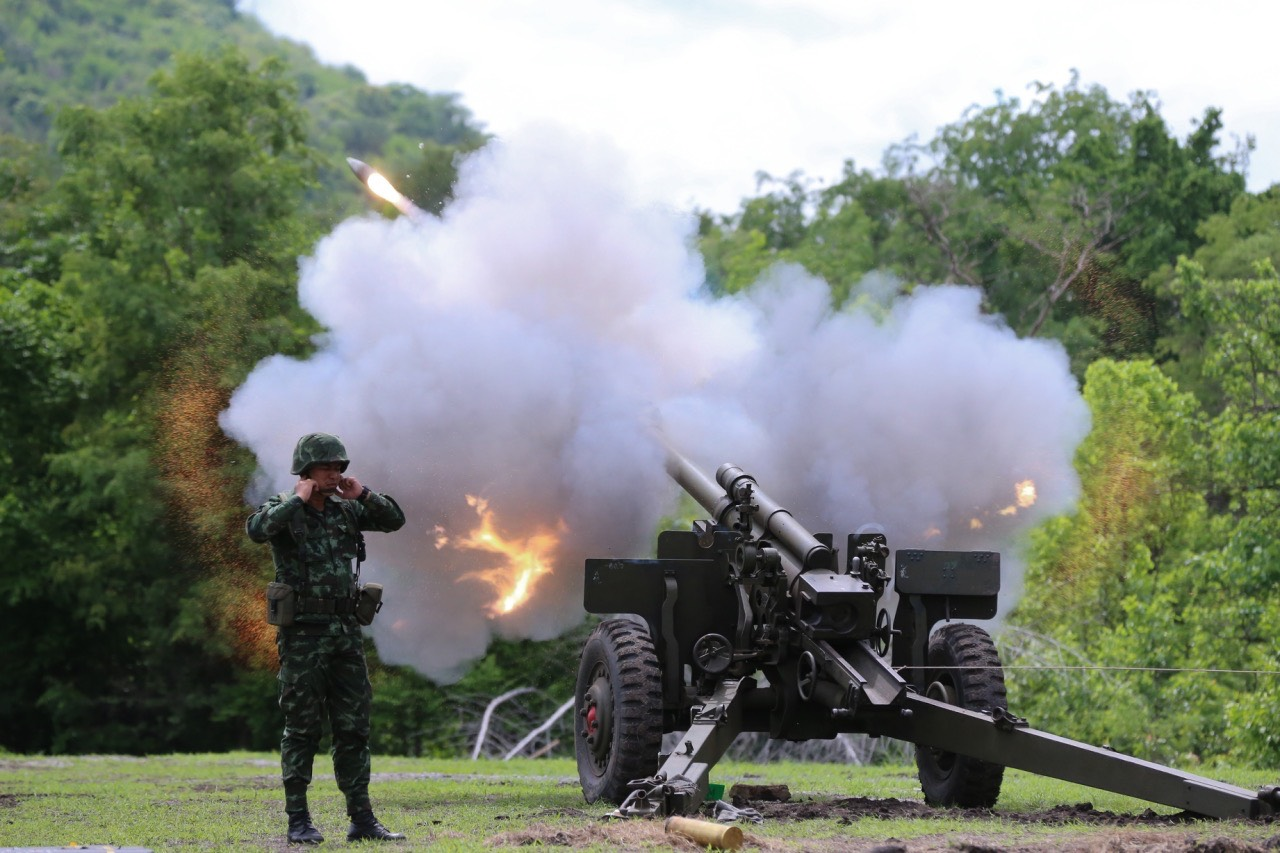
Royal Thai Army firing extended range ammunition from M101 modified with LG1 L/33 cal barrel.

=== Current ===
- Benin − 4 as of 2026.
- Bolivia − 25 as of 2026.
- Brazil − Used by the Army and Marines.
- Burkina Faso − 8 as of 2026.
- Cameroon − 20 as of 2026.
- Canada − 93 as of 2026, designated as the C3.
- Chile − 87 as of 2026.
- Colombia − 85 as of 2026.
- Dominican Republic − 4 as of 2026.
- Ecuador − 36 as of 2026
- Gabon − 4 as of 2026.
- Greece − 226 as of 2026.
- Guatemala − 12 as of 2026.
- Indonesia − 60+, including South Korean KH-178s as of 2026.
- Iran − 130 M101A1s as of 2026.
- South Korea − 1,500+ as of 2026, used by the Army and Marine Corps.
- Laos − 20 as of 2026.
- Lebanon − 12 M101A1s as of 2026.
- Lithuania − 18 as of 2026.
- Madagascar − 5 as of 2026.
- Mauritania − 36 HM-2s as of 2026.
- Mexico − 40 as of 2026.
- Morocco − 20 as of 2026.
- Mozambique − 12 as of 2026.
- Myanmar − 96 as of 2026.
- Pakistan − 216 as of 2026.
- Paraguay − 21 as of 2026, used by the Army and Marines.
- Peru − 44 as of 2026.
- Philippines − Used by the Army and Marine Corps.
- Senegal − 6 HM-2s as of 2026.
- Sudan
- Taiwan − 650 as of 2026, designated as the T64.
- Thailand − 236 M101A1s as of 2026, used by the Royal Thai Army and Royal Thai Marine Corps.
- Tunisia − M101A1
- Turkey − 75+ M101A1s as of 2026.
- Ukraine − 26+ as of 2026, used by the Ukrainian Ground Forces and National Police of Ukraine.
- United States − 331 M101A1s as of 2026, used by the Marine Corps
- Uruguay − 28 M101A1 as of 2026
- Venezuela − 40 M101A1 as of 2026
- Vietnam

=== Former ===
- Argentina − 6, used by the Marines.
- Australia
- Austria
- Bangladesh
- Belgium
- Bosnia and Herzegovina − 25
- Chad − 5
- People's Republic of China - Captured during the Chinese Civil War and the Korean War.
- Republic of China - Received via lend lease during the World War II and the Chinese Civil War.
- Croatia − 61
- Cyprus
- Denmark
- El Salvador
- France
- Germany − 10
- Honduras
- Iraq
- Israel − 70
- Italy
- Ivory Coast
- Japan − Produced locally as the Type 58.
- Jordan
- Kampuchea
- Liberia
- Libya − 42
- North Macedonia − 18, replaced by the MKE Boran
- Netherlands
- Nicaragua
- Norway
- Portugal − 21 M101A1s in storage as of 2026, replaced by the L119 light gun.
- Rwanda
- Saudi Arabia − Kept in storage as of 2026, replaced by the GIAT LG1.
- Serbia and Montenegro − 54
- Slovenia − 6
- Spain
- Togo − 4
- South Vietnam
- Yemen − 25
- Yugoslavia

== See also ==
- List of U.S. Army weapons by supply catalog designation (SNL C-21)
- M3 howitzer – Shortened barrel variant of M2 howitzer.
- M102 howitzer – The US partial replacement for M101 howitzer.
- KH178 105 mm towed howitzer – South Korean 38 calibers variant of M101A1.
- Indian Field Gun – Indian 105 mm howitzer.
- L118 light gun – British 105 mm howitzer.
- M119 howitzer – The US license of L118, replacement for M101 and M102 howitzer.
- GIAT LG1 – French 105 mm howitzer.
