= Hyundai WIA =

South Korean defence company

Hyundai WIA Corporation
- Native name: 현대위아 주식회사
- Formerly: Samwon Factory (1976–1977); Kia Machine Tool (1977–1996); Kia Heavy Industry (1996–2001); WIA (2001–2009)
- Company type: Public
- Traded as: KRX: 011210
- Industry: Automotive; Defense; Machinery
- Founded: 29 March 1976; 50 years ago
- Headquarters: Seongsan District, Changwon, South Korea
- Area served: Worldwide
- Key people: O-Sung Kwon (president and CEO)
- Products: Aircraft parts; Automotive engines and modules; Constant-velocity joint; Large-caliber artillery; Machine tools; Four-wheel drive systems
- Revenue: ▲ ₩8.2076 trillion (2022)
- Operating income: ▲ ₩212.1 billion (2022)
- Net income: ▼ ₩43.5 billion (2022)
- Total assets: ▼ ₩7.5465 trillion (2022)
- Total equity: ▲ ₩3.7337 trillion (2022)
- Owner: Hyundai Motor Company (40.74%); National Pension Service (9.96%); Treasury stocks (2.02%); Employee stock ownership (0.03%); Other (0.03%)
- Number of employees: 2,886 (July, 2022)
- Parent: Hyundai Motor Group
- Website: Official website in English; Official website in Korean

- Hyundai WIA
- Hangul: 현대위아
- RR: Hyeondae Wia
- MR: Hyŏndae Wia

Hyundai WIA Corporation (Korean: 현대위아; RR: Hyeondae Wia), formerly known as WIA (World Industries Ace; Korean: 위아; RR: Wia) is a member of the Hyundai Motor Group and is the second biggest automotive parts manufacturer in South Korea. As one of the core companies of Hyundai Motor Group, it is supplying automobile engines, modules, C.V Joint and 4WD systems to automobile companies such as Hyundai, Kia, and Genesis. In addition, it is in charge of manufacturing and selling FA (Factory Automation) facilities, various large-caliber artillery, aircraft parts, robots, and press device. The main customers who earn most of their sales are Hyundai, Kia, Genesis, and the Ministry of National Defense.

On 10 August 2009, the company name was changed from WIA to Hyundai WIA to target the global market and increase brand competitiveness.

== Business Area ==
=== Automotive ===
- Automotive parts
- Automotive module
- Automobile engine

=== Machinery ===
- CNC turning centers
  - SE-SY Series
  - HD-Y Series
  - HD2600
  - HD3100
- Machining centers
  - KF-B Series
  - XF2000
  - XF8500
- FA (Factory automation)
- Robot

=== Defense ===
Sources

- Artillery
  - KH178, 105 mm 38 caliber towed howitzer developed in 1978
  - KH179, 155 mm 39 caliber towed howitzer developed in 1979
  - CN98 155 mm 52 caliber self-propelled howitzer used on board K9 Thunder, developed in 1998
  - KM256 120 mm 44 caliber smoothbore gun used on board K1A1 (Licensed production)
  - CN03 120 mm 44 caliber smoothbore gun used on board K1A2, developed in 2003
  - CN08 120 mm 55 caliber smoothbore gun used on board K2 Black Panther, developed in 2008
- Mortar
  - KM181 60 mm mortar developed in 1985
  - KM187 81 mm mortar developed in 1996
  - KMS114 81 mm mortar developed in 2019
  - XKM120 120 mm self-propelled mortar developed in 2019
- Recoilless rifle
  - M67 recoilless rifle (Licensed production)
  - M40 recoilless rifle (Licensed production)
- Remote controlled weapon stations
  - RW01K
- Naval armament systems
  - K-76L/62 naval gun developed in 2007
  - 5"/54 caliber Mark 45 gun (Licensed production)
  - OTO Melara 76 mm (Licensed production)
  - Bofors 57 mm Naval Automatic Gun L/70 (Licensed production)
  - Bofors 40 mm Automatic Gun L/70 (Licensed production)
  - Goalkeeper CIWS (Licensed production)
- Aerospace systems
  - Main & Nose landing gear
  - Main rotor control
  - Pilot seat
  - Commercial airplane
  - Landing gear

=== Business of heavy machinery ===
- Plant
- Press

=== Global business ===
- Machinery business
- Automotive parts business
- Automotive engine business
- Components and materials business
- Molding business

== See also ==
- Defense industry of South Korea
- List of companies of South Korea
