= GIAT LG1 =

GIAT LG-1
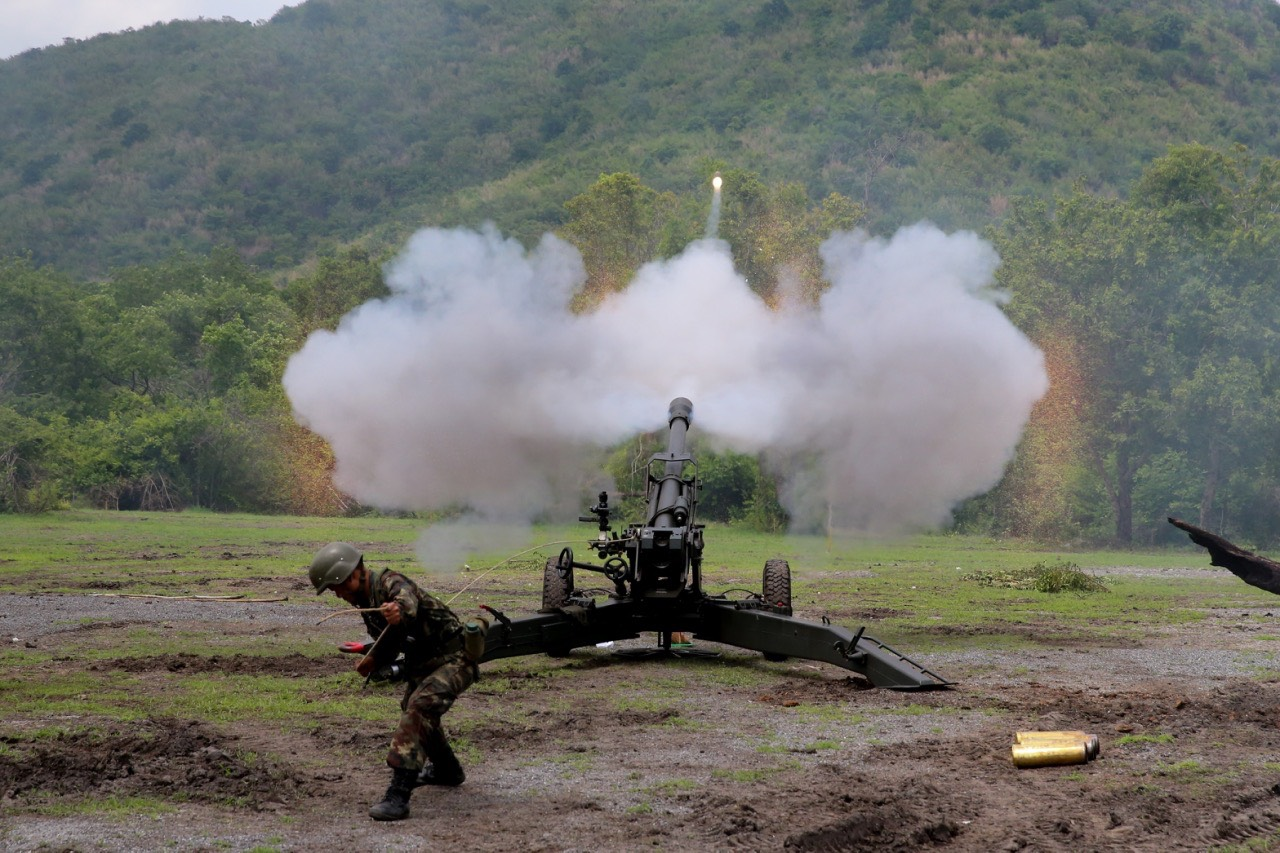
- Royal Thai Army firing extended range ammunition from LG1 during training in Lopburi, Thailand
- Type: Howitzer
- Place of origin: France

Service history
- Used by: See operators
- Wars: 2025 Cambodia-Thailand conflict

Production history
- Designer: GIAT Industries (now Nexter group)
- Manufacturer: GIAT Industries
- Unit cost: $475,000 (Mk II, 1994), $1,998,000 (Mk III, 2023)
- No. built: 130

Specifications
- Mass: 1,520 kg (3,350 lb)
- Barrel length: 3.15 m (10 ft 4 in) L/30
- Crew: 5
- Shell: 105 mm NATO
- Breech: Horizontal-block
- Carriage: Split trail
- Elevation: -3°/+70°
- Traverse: ±25° from centerline
- Rate of fire: 12 rounds per minute
- Maximum firing range: 17 kilometres (11 mi) using Base bleed rounds

The LG1 is a modern 105 mm towed howitzer designed and produced by GIAT Industries (now Nexter group) of France.

== Design ==
The LG1 howitzer is a 105 mm towed artillery piece that features both low weight and a high level of accuracy over long distances. Its lightweight construction gives the barrel a relatively short lifespan. The equivalent full charge (EFC) count is suggested to be approximately 7,500; however, during fire and practice, has yielded only around 1,500 EFCs. The gun was specifically designed for use by rapid deployment forces with attributes such as ruggedness, ease of operation and reduced weight. It can fire all NATO standard 105 mm ammunition up to a range of 17 kilometres (11 mi) using HE-ER G3 base bleed rounds.

== Deployment ==
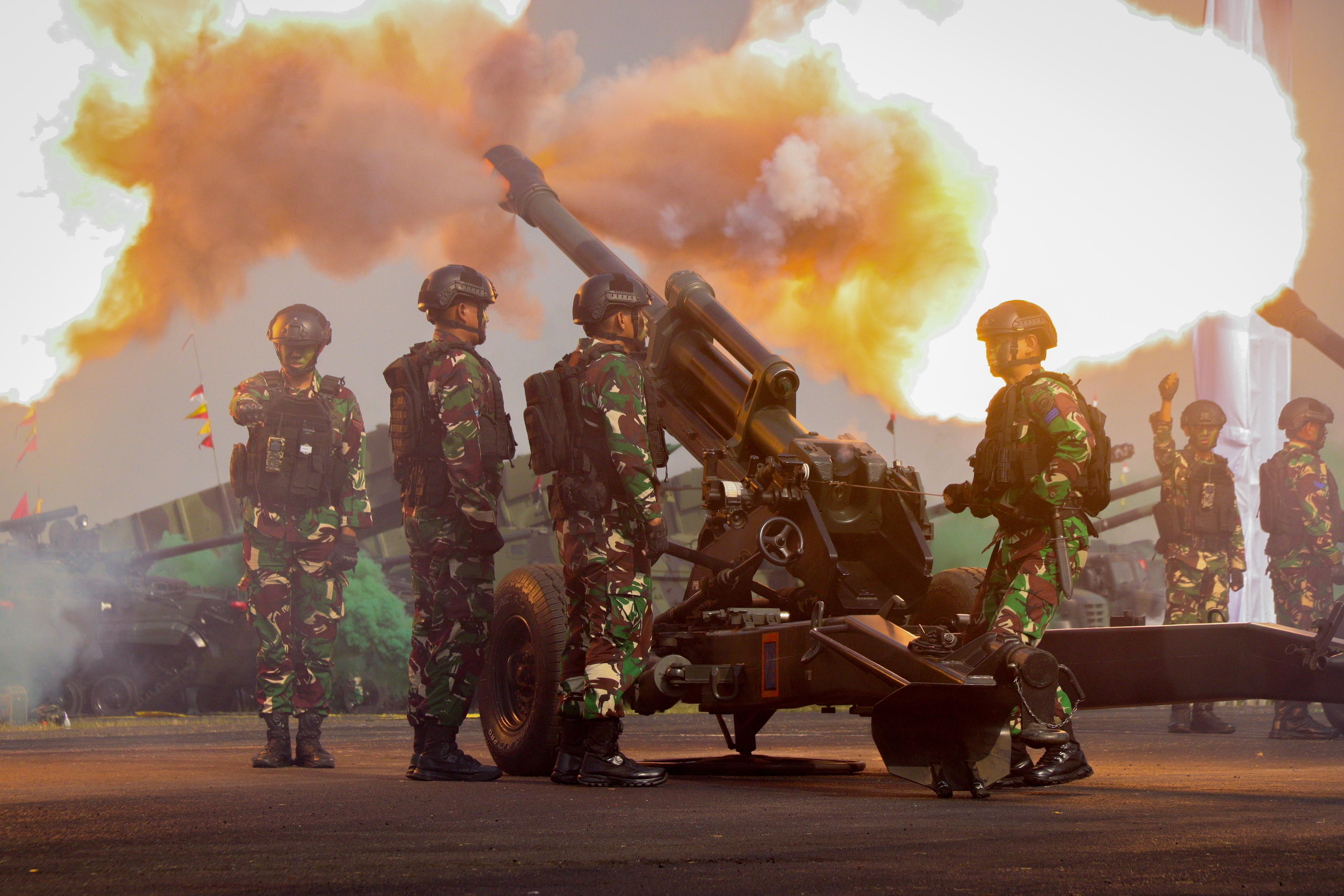
Indonesian Marine soldiers fire a round out of a GIAT LG1 MK II 105mm howitzer during a rehearsal of The Operational Troops and Military Honors Ceremony 2025.

The gun has been used by the Belgian Army, Canadian Army, Colombian National Army, Malaysian Army, Indonesian Marine Corps, Singapore Army and the Royal Thai Army.

Current service version with Canadian artillery is the LG1 Mark II, of which 28 were purchased for the Royal Canadian Horse Artillery (RCHA). GIAT supplied the first howitzers in 1996 and fielding was complete by November 1997.

== Planned improvements ==
In August 2005, DEPRO (GVB) Incorporated - a Canadian defence firm, was selected by the Canadian Forces to improve their LG-1 guns with improvements ranging from new & better muzzle brake, new-designed spades for better stability during firing and larger tires to replace the small Pirelli tires (which were found to be inadequate for proper ground clearance while on the move). It is expected that this new set of improvements will give the LG-1 howitzers greater reliability and lifespan, and increase the safety margin for the crew.

== Combat history ==
- Internal Conflict in Colombia
- War against Taliban in Afghanistan
- Counter Insurgency in Aceh

== Operators ==
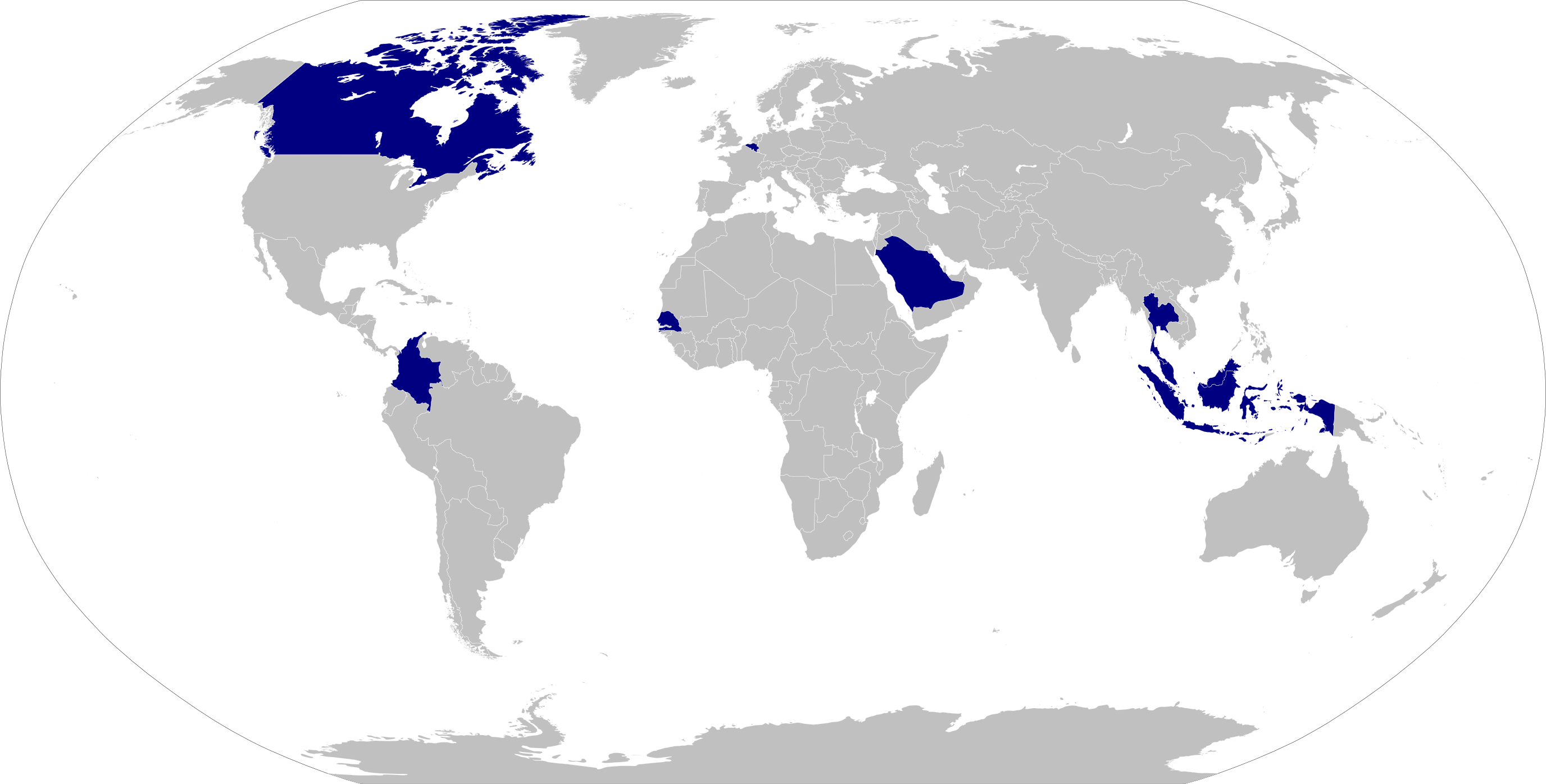
Map with LG1 operators in blue and former operators in red

=== Current operators ===
Belgium :

- Belgian Army - 14

Canada :

- Canadian Army - 28

Colombia :

- Colombian Army - 20 LG1 MkIII ordered in 2008 + 20 ordered in 2012. There were several problems with its buffers and trunnions, along with accuracy issues in its INS Keafott KN-4051 fire control system after a few rounds and constant use/real fire training, therefore the manufacturer included improvements in its buffer system, cradle and trunnions, also the FCS was changed for the Nexter BACARA FCS, tested and approved in 2014.

Indonesia :

- Indonesian Marine Corps - 20

Malaysia :

- Malaysian Army - 18 units ordered in 2018. Locally assembled by Advanced Defence Systems Sdn. Bhd. (ADSSB)

Thailand :

- Royal Thai Army - 24 Units
- Royal Thai Marine Corps - 30 Units

Saudi Arabia :

- Royal Saudi Land Forces - 88 Ordered in 2017, delivered from 2018

Senegal :

- Senegalese Army - 8 ordered in 2022

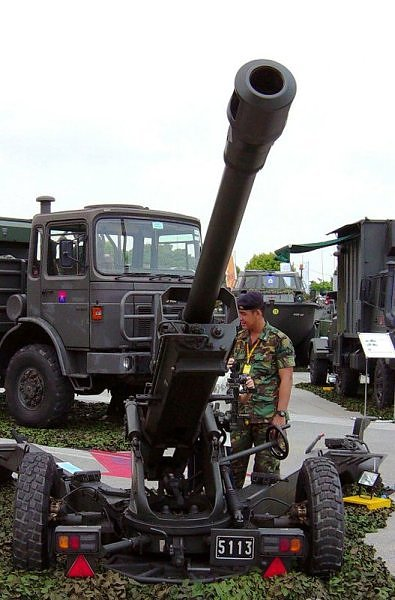
A single LG-1 105 mm light howitzer on static display during Singapore Army Open House.

=== Former operators ===
Singapore :

- Singapore Army - 39 (Phased out in 2008, replaced by the 155mm calibre SLWH Pegasus)

Rwanda :

- The former Forces Armées Rwandaises received some LG1s, after the Rwandan Civil War erupted in 1990.

== See also ==
- L118 light gun
- M119 howitzer
- MKE Boran 105 mm howitzer
- Indian Field Gun
- KH178 105 mm towed howitzer
