= M114 155 mm howitzer =

US-made towed howitzer

155 mm Howitzer M114 155 mm Howitzer M1
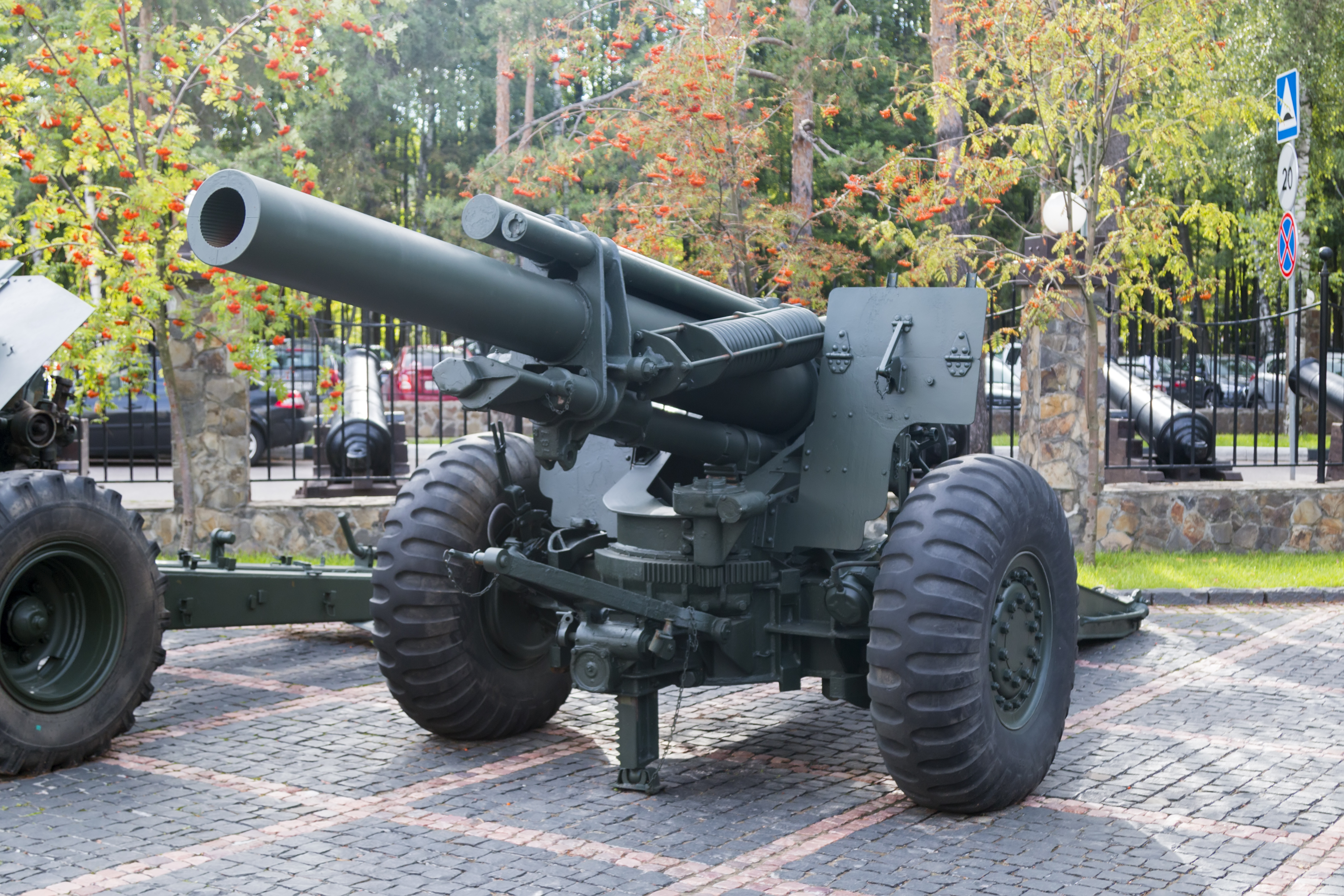
- Type: Field Howitzer
- Place of origin: United States

Service history
- In service: 1942–present
- Used by: See § Operators
- Wars: World War II; Korean War; Vietnam War; Cambodian Civil War; Laotian Civil War; Lebanese Civil War; Salvadoran Civil War; Iran–Iraq War; Kurdish–Turkish conflict (1978–present); Yugoslav Wars; Syrian Civil War; Russian invasion of Ukraine; Operation Zarb e Azb; 2025 India-Pakistan conflict; 2025 Afghanistan-Pakistan conflict

Production history
- Designer: U.S. Army Ordnance Department
- Designed: 1939–1941
- Manufacturer: Rock Island Arsenal (US)
- Produced: 1941–1953 (US)
- No. built: 10,300 (US)
- Variants: See § Variants

Specifications
- Mass: Travel: 12,800 lb (5,800 kg); Combat: 12,300 lb (5,600 kg)
- Length: Travel: 24 ft 0 in (7.315 m)
- Barrel length: Overall: 12 ft 5 in (3.79 m) L/24.5; Bore: 11 ft 8 in (3.564 m) L/23
- Width: Travel: 8 ft 0 in (2.438 m)
- Height: Travel: 5 ft 11 in (1.8 m)
- Crew: 11
- Shell: Separate-loading bagged charge
- Caliber: 6.1 in (155 mm)
- Breech: Slow-cone interrupted screw
- Recoil: Hydro-pneumatic
- Carriage: Split trail
- Elevation: −2° / +63°
- Traverse: 25° left / 25° right
- Rate of fire: Burst: 4 rpm Sustained: 40 rounds per hour
- Muzzle velocity: 1,850 ft/s (563 m/s)
- Maximum firing range: 16,000 yd (14,600 m)

The 155 mm Howitzer M114 is a towed howitzer developed and used by the United States Army. It was first produced in 1941 as a medium artillery piece under the designation of 155 mm Howitzer M1. It saw service with the US Army during World War II, the Korean War, and the Vietnam War, before being replaced by the M198 howitzer.

The gun was also used by the armed forces of many nations. The M114A1 remains in service in some countries.

== Development ==
=== Early development ===
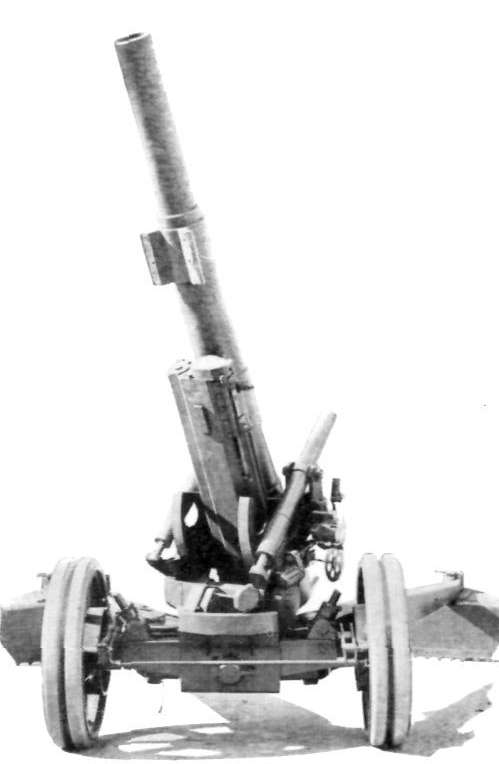
155 mm howitzer M1920

After the end of the First World War a board - later named the Westervelt Board after its president, Brigadier General William I. Westervelt - was convened to assess the artillery experience of the combatant powers and map out future directions for the US Army artillery. The conclusion of the board vis-a-vis corps (heavy field) artillery was that an ideal heavy howitzer should have range of at least 16,000 yards (15 km) and allow elevation of 65° (Note: the existing World War I-era M-1918 155 mm howitzers, a license-built French Canon de 155 C modèle 1917 Schneider, had range and elevation of 11.5 km and +42° 20' respectively) The board also recommended that the new 155-mm howitzer and the new 4.7-inch (120 mm) gun use the same carriage, even if it compromised both designs.

The M1920 carriage resulting from this requirements was of the split-trail type with pneumatic equilibrators, permitting a total traverse of 60°. Unfortunately, it "gave considerable trouble due to the persistent failure of the top carriage" on the firing tests. In 1923–1925 the design was modified with the top carriage reinforced and standardized as M1925. However, it was never built in steel, because after the evaluation of a wooden model the project was abandoned. Instead, two new carriages were developed and built in the following years, which were designated T1 and T1E1. All of them had the same ballistics (perhaps even the same gun body), with maximal range of 16,390 yards (14.99 km), and were undergoing tests in the early 1930s. By 1934, the US Army was concerned about the arising high-speed towing requirements not satisfied by the plain bearings and solid rubber ties.

=== Before and during World War II ===
In 1939 development began anew, by spring 1941 the first specimen was ready to be test-fired and immediately after passing those tests it was standardized, on 15 May 1941, as "Howitzer M1 on the Carriage M1". The howitzer itself differed from the older model by a longer barrel of 20 calibers and a new breech mechanism. Uniquely it was the sole 'slow-cone' interrupted screw mechanism to enter US service after 1920.

The carriage was also used by the 4.5-inch gun M1. It went through a number of minor changes over time. The original Warner electric brakes were replaced by Westinghouse air brakes on the M1A1. Both the M1 and M1A1 carriages used a mid-axle firing pedestal that was extended by a ratchet mechanism. The M1A2 replaced the ratchet with a screw-jack system and also modified the traveling lock. The M1A1E1 carriage was intended for use in jungle and muddy terrain and replaced the wheels of the M1A1 with a free-wheeling tracked suspension, but the project was terminated after V-J Day without having reached production. The T-9 and T-10 carriages were projects using low-grade steel alloys that were canceled when no longer needed. The T-16 was a light-weight carriage using high-grade steel that was estimated to save some 1,200 lb (540 kg); work began in July 1945 and continued after the war, although nothing seems to have come from it.

=== Post World War II ===
"Weapons of the Field Artillery" (1966).

After World War II, the production of M1 howitzers continued to 1953. Additionally it was redesignated as the Howitzer, Medium, Towed: 155 mm, M114, with the complete system composed of the cannon (M1), carriage (M1A1), and recoil system (M6, M6A1, M6B1 or M6B2).

A mid-1960s carriage variant was the 155mm XM123 & M123A1 auxiliary-propelled howitzers. The XM123 was produced by American Machine and Foundry and outfitted with two 20 horsepower air-cooled engines produced by Consolidated Diesel Corporation, driver's seat, steering wheel, and guide wheel on the left trail, allowing it to be more rapidly emplaced when detached from the prime mover, while the XM123A1 provided a single 20 horsepower motor with electric steering. The extra weight on the left trail displaced the howitzer after each round was fired, requiring it to be realigned, and the project was abandoned. The concept was copied from the Soviet 85mm SD-44 auxiliary-propelled anti-tank gun developed in 1954 and used by airborne forces (VDV).

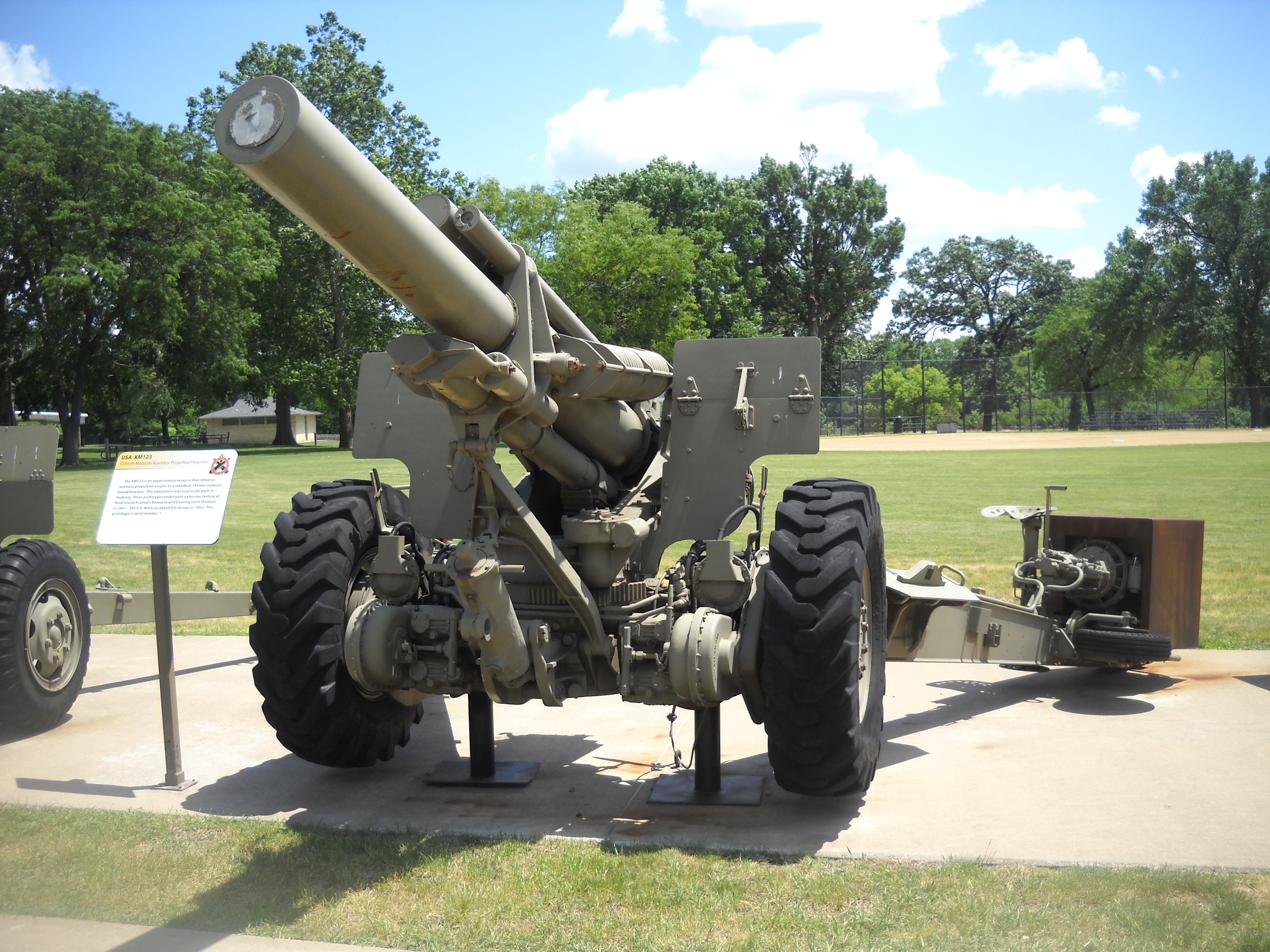
Front view of an XM123 medium auxiliary propelled 155 mm howitzer at the Rock Island Arsenal Museum

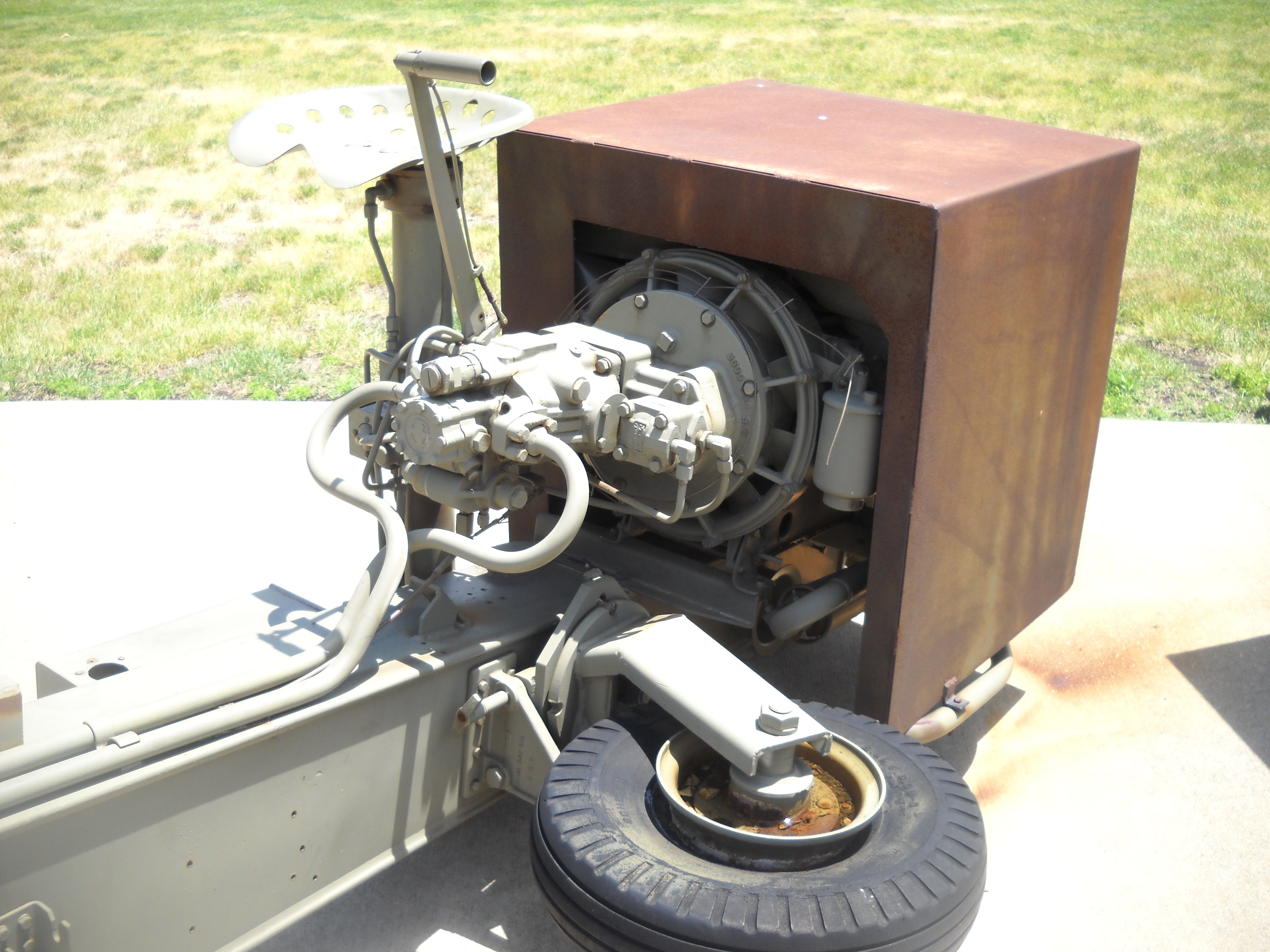
XM123 medium auxiliary propelled 155 mm howitzer seat and power unit at the Rock Island Arsenal Museum

== Variants ==
- Gun variants:
  - M1920 − Prototype.
  - M1925 − First standardized variant. Unbuilt prototype, only exist as a wooden model.
  - T1, T1E1 (1930s) − Prototype.
  - M1 (1941) − First variant to went into production. Barrel lengthened by 20 calibers, new breech mechanism.
- Carriage variants:
  - M1920 − Prototype.
  - M1925 − First standardized variant. Unbuilt prototype, only exist as a wooden model.
  - T1, T1E1 (1930s) − Prototype.
  - M1 (1941) − Split trail carriage, pneumatic tires, mid-axle firing pedestal extended by a ratchet mechanism.
  - M1A1 − M1 with electric brakes replaced with air brakes.
    - M1A1E1 − Intended for use in jungle and muddy terrain, wheels replaced with a free-wheeling tracked suspension. Project terminated without reaching production.
  - M1A2 − M1 / M1A1 with the ratchet mechanism replaced by a screw-jack system, modified traveling lock.
  - T-9, T-10 − Projects using low-grade steel alloys. Canceled.
  - T-16 − Light-weight carriage using high-grade steel. Canceled.

Post war variants

- M114A1 − Identical to the M114, but with a M1A2 carriage.
- M114A2 − Similar to the M114A1, but with a slightly longer barrel. Its main distinguishing feature is a groove cut around the barrel about 2.0–2.8 inches (50–70 mm) from the end. The bore of the M114A2 have a 1 in 20 twist instead of the 1 in 12 used in earlier models, extending the range of the projectiles. In 1997, the United States supplied Bosnia-Herzegovina with 116 ex-US Army M114A2s while an additional 145 were earmarked for spare parts.
- M114/39 (Netherlands) − Dutch modernization by RDM Technology, it features a 155 mm 39 caliber barrel supplied by Bofors (now BAE Systems) amongst other upgrades. 96 M114s were modernized for Denmark, 82 for the Netherlands, and 48 for Norway.
- M114/39 (France) − French modernization package by Giat Industries, it included 39 calibers long barrel. It was never sold.
- M114S − Israeli modernization package by Soltam Systems, the M114S features a 33 calibers long barrel, allowing a standard 155 mm M107 HE projectile to be fired to a maximum distance of 20,000 yards (18,300 m); a muzzle brake in the barrel, a pneumatic ramming system for the loader, improved mounts and fixtures, and an optional telescopic sight for direct fire. One prototype was built, but wasn't adopted by the Israel Defense Forces or exported.
- KM114A1 - Reverse engineered version of the M114A1 by South Korea. It is modified to fire RAP ammunition at a maximum range of 12.1 mi (19.5 km). Produced since the late 1970s until the introduction of the KH179.
- 155 mm Howitzer M65 − Yugoslav copy of the M114A1, which was also used by the Yugoslav People's Army. It is virtually identical to the original, with a few minor differences. The M65 fires the standard American M107 HE shell. For training the M65 can be fitted with a 20 mm (0.79 in) sub-caliber barrel insert. It was built only in small numbers.

== Self-propelled mounts ==
The howitzer was experimentally mounted on a lengthened chassis of the M5 light tank. The resulting vehicle received the designation 155 mm Howitzer Motor Carriage T64. A single prototype was built before the T64 project was abandoned in favor of T64E1, based on the M24 Chaffee light tank chassis. This was eventually adopted as the M41 Howitzer Motor Carriage and saw action in the Korean War. Towards the end of the Korean War the US Army replaced the M41 self-propelled howitzer with the M44 self-propelled howitzer.

== Ammunition ==
The gun fires separate-loading, bagged charge ammunition, with up to seven different propelling charges, from 1 (the smallest) to 7 (the largest). Muzzle velocity, range and penetration in the tables below are for maximum charge in form of complete M4A1 propelling charge.

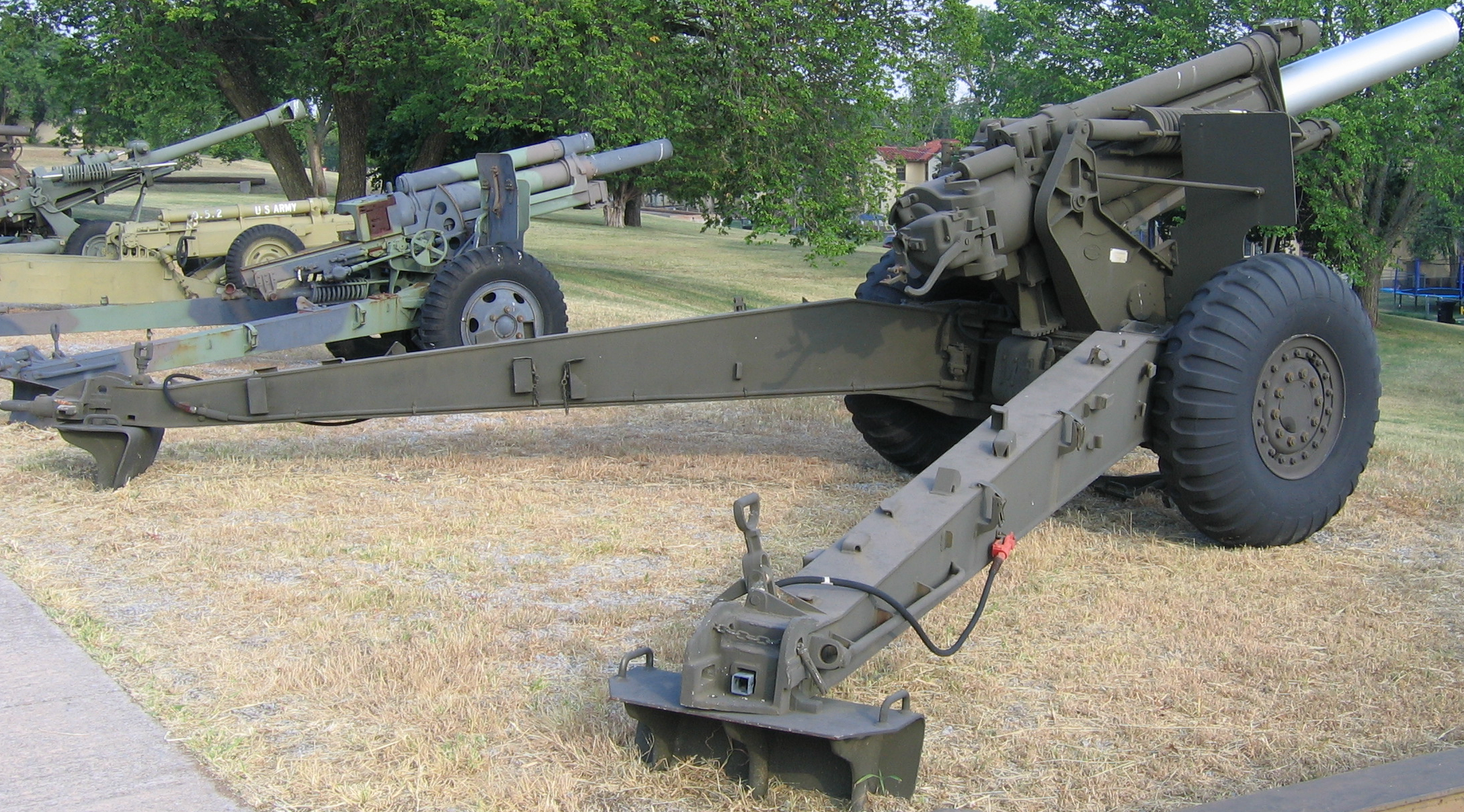
155 mm howitzer M114 at the U.S. Army Field Artillery Museum, Ft. Sill, Oklahoma

Propelling charges
Model	Weight	Components
Standard charges
M3	5.93 lb (2.69 kg)	Base charge and four incremental charges (for charges 1 to 5)
M4	13.87 lb (6.29 kg)	Base charge and two incremental charges (for charges 5 to 7)
M4A1	13.91 lb (6.31 kg)	Base charge and four incremental charges (for charges 3 to 7)
Dummy charges
Mk I Dummy	8.00 lb (3.63 kg)	Base charge and six incremental charges
M2 Dummy	7.36 lb (3.34 kg)	Base charge and six incremental charges

Projectiles
Type	Model	Weight	Filler	iller weight	Muzzle velocity	Range'
High-explosive shells
HE	HE M102 Shell	100 lb (43.13 kg)	TNT	15.56 lb (7.06 kg)		
HE	HE M107 Shell	90 lb (43.00 kg)	TNT	15.12 lb (6.86 kg)	1,850 ft/s (564 m/s)	16,355 yd (14,955 m)
Smoke shells
Smoke	FS M105 Shell	100 lb (45.14 kg)	Sulfur trioxide in Chlorosulfonic acid	16.91 lb (7.67 kg)		
Smoke	WP M105 Shell	100 lb (44.55 kg)	White phosphorus (WP)	15 lb 9.74 oz (7.08 kg)		
Smoke	FS M110 Shell	100 lb 3 oz (45.45 kg)	Sulfur trioxide in Chlorosulfonic acid	16.91 lb (7.67 kg)		
Smoke	WP M110 Shell	100 lb (44.63 kg)	White phosphorus (WP)	15.61 lb (7.08 kg)		
Smoke, colored	BE M116 Shell	90 lb (39.21 kg)	Smoke mixture	17.20 lb (7.8 kg)		
Smoke	HC BE M116 Shell	100 lb (43.14 kg)	Zinc chloride (HC)	25.79 lb (11.7 kg)	1,850 ft/s (564 m/s)	16,355 yd (14,955 m)
Chemical, nuclear and illumination shells
Chemical	CNS M110 Shell	100 lb (44.05 kg)	Chloroacetophenone (CN)	13.80 lb (6.26 kg)		
Chemical	H M110 Shell	90 lb (43.09 kg)	Mustard gas	11.07 lb (5.02 kg)	1,850 ft/s (564 m/s)	16,374 yd (14,972 m)
Nuclear	W48 Shell	100 lb (54 kg)	Nuclear	100 tonnes of TNT (420 GJ) equivalent	1,850 ft/s (564 m/s)	16,374 yd (14,972 m)
Illumination	Illumin. M118 Shell	100 lb (46.77 kg)	Illuminant candles	8.86 lb (4.02 kg)		
Drill (training) shells
Drill	Dummy Mk I Projectile					
Drill	Dummy M7 Projectile	90 lb (43.09 kg)				

Concrete penetration, mm
Ammunition \ Distance	0 yd (0 m)	1,000 yd (914 m)	3,000 yd (2,743 m)	5,000 yd (4,572 m)
HE M107 Shell (meet angle 0°)	2 ft 11 in (884 mm)	2 ft 7 in (792 mm)	2 ft (610 mm)	1 ft 7 in (488 mm)
Different methods of measurement were used in different countries / periods. Therefore, direct comparison is often impossible.

== Operators ==
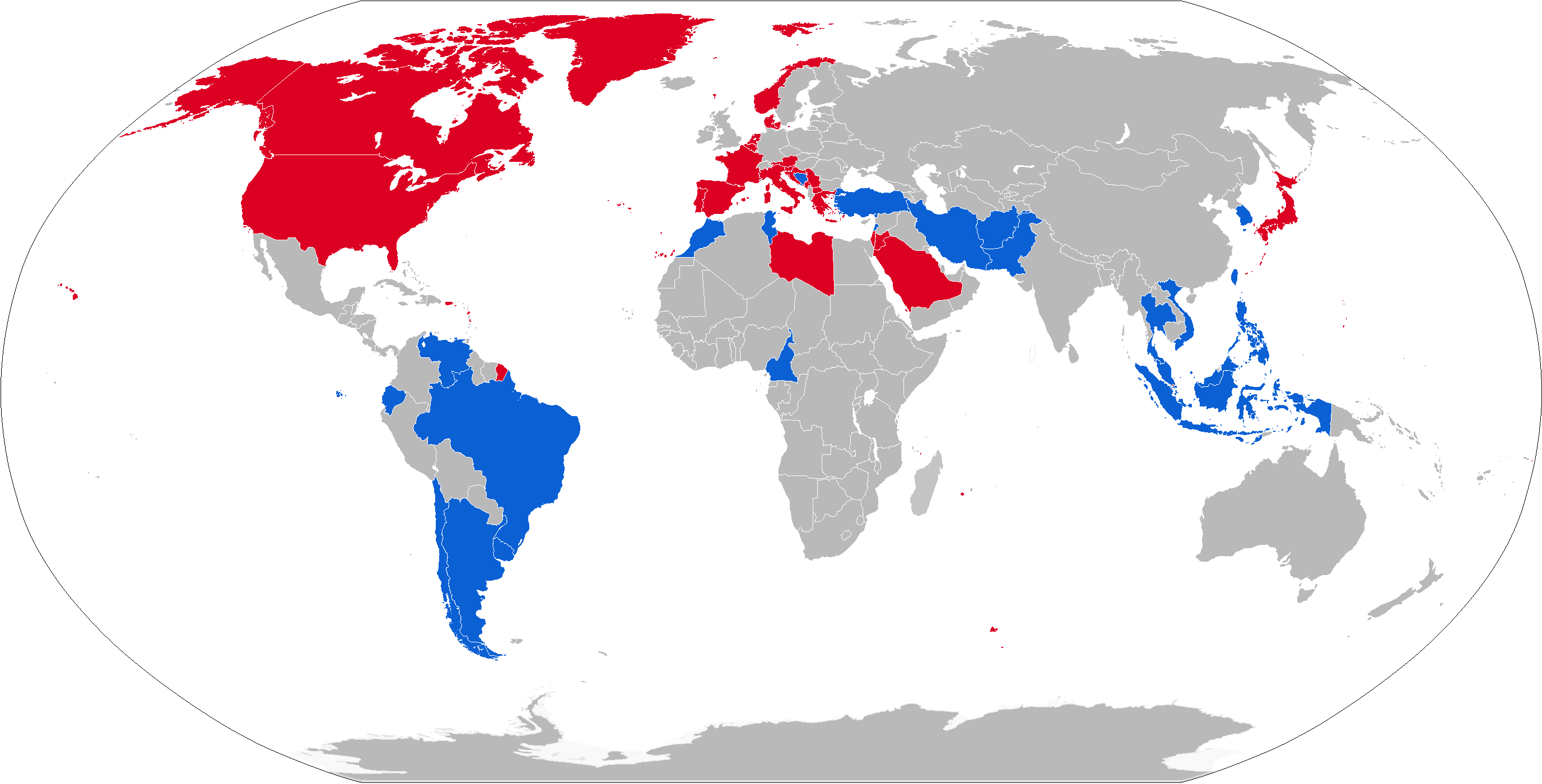
Operators Current Former

=== Current ===
- Argentina − 6 as of 2024, used by the Marines
- Brazil − 81 used by the Army as of 2024
- Cyprus − 12
- Ecuador − 12 as of 2024
- Greece − 230 as of 2024
- Iran − 70 as of 2024, some were upgraded to the HM-41 standard
- Jordan − 18 as of 2024
- Laos − 12 as of 2024
- Morocco − 20 as of 2024
- Pakistan − 144 as of 2024
- Peru − 36 as of 2024
- Philippines − 10 M114 and Soltam M-68 as of 2024
- Portugal − 24 M114A1 as of 2024
- Saudi Arabia − 50 as of 2024
- Sudan
- Taiwan − 250 as of 2024, produced under license as the T-65
- Tunisia − 12 M114A1 as of 2024
- Turkey − 517 M114A1/A2 as of 2024
- Uruguay − 8 M114A1 as of 2024
- Ukraine − In March 2024, it was reported that Greece was negotiating with the Czech Republic a possible transfer of 70 ex-Hellenic Army M114A1s to Ukraine
  - Kastuś Kalinoŭski Regiment
- Venezuela − 12 M114A1 as of 2024
- Vietnam

=== Former ===
- Austria − 24
- Bosnia and Herzegovina − 119 M114A2
- Brazil - phased out in the Brazilian Marine Corps by 2025
- Cambodia − 10
- Canada − 57
- Croatia − M65
- Croatian Republic of Herzeg-Bosnia − M65
- Denmark − 96 M114/39
- Ethiopian Empire − 12
- West Germany − 100
- Imperial State of Iran − 100
- Israel − 50
- Italy
- Japan − 220 total, a small number were produced domestically as Type 58. All retired.
- South Korea − First received in September 1951, 294 M1 howitzers were in service by the end of the Korean War. Also produced reverse engineered version of M114A1 as KM114A1 between the late 1970s to early 1980s.
- Lebanon − 18
- Libya − 20
- Montenegro − M114A1 and M65
- Norway − 48 M114/39
- Netherlands − at least 144 M114A1 of which 82 were modernized to M114/39
- Republika Srpska − M65
- Serbia − M114A1 and M65
- Serbian Krajina− M65
- Singapore − 16
- Somalia − 6
- Spain − 52
- Thailand − 48 in storage as of 2024
- United States
- South Vietnam − 100
- North Yemen − 12
- Yemen − 12
- FR Yugoslavia − M114A1 and M65
- Yugoslavia − M114A1 and M65 used. Passed on to successor states

== See also ==
- List of U.S. Army weapons by supply catalog designation (SNL C-39)
- M777 howitzer – (United Kingdom)

comparable weapons

- BL 5.5-inch medium gun – (United Kingdom)
- 152 mm howitzer M1938 (M-10) – (Soviet Union)
- 152 mm howitzer M1943 (D-1) – (Soviet Union)
- 15 cm sFH 18 – (Germany)
- Skoda K series – (Czechoslovakia)

compatible shells

- M549 – (United States)
- M864 – (United States)
- M795 – (United States)
