= KH178 =

Towed howitzer

KH178 105 mm Towed Howitzer
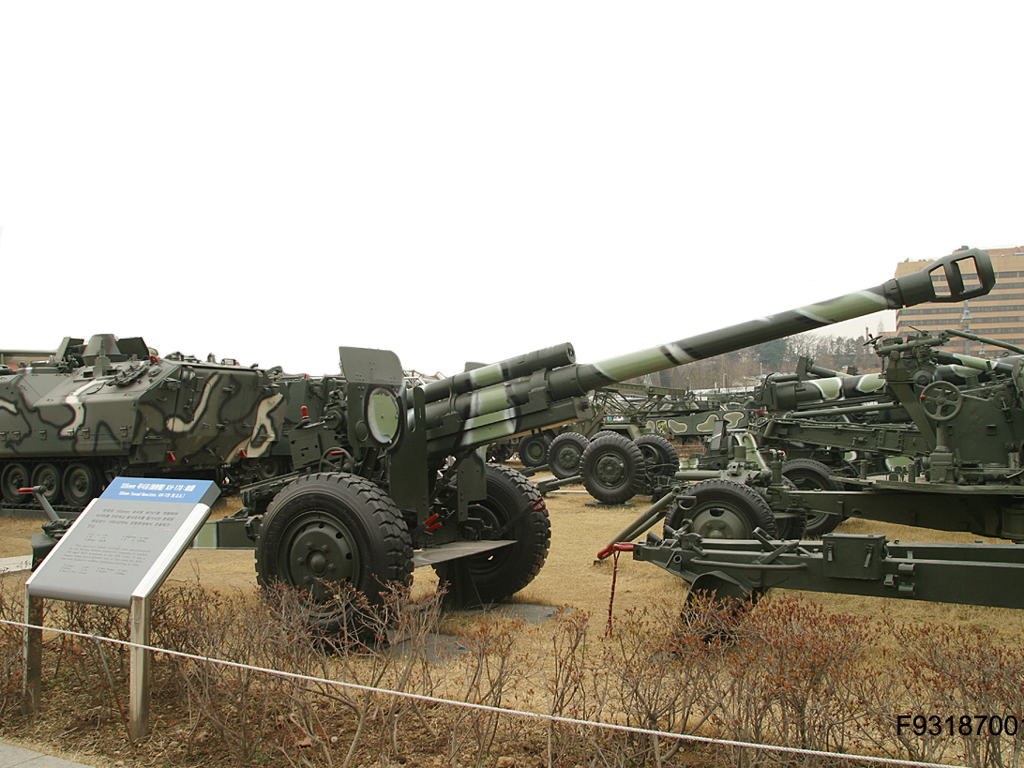
- Type: Howitzer
- Place of origin: South Korea

Service history
- In service: 1983–present
- Used by: See Users

Production history
- Designer: Agency for Defense Development
- Designed: 1977–1978
- Manufacturer: Kia Machine Tool (1983–1996); Kia Heavy Industry (1996–2001); WIA (2001–2009); Hyundai Wia (2009–present)
- Produced: 1983–present
- Variants: KH178MK1

Specifications
- Mass: 2,650 kg (5,840 lb)
- Length: 4.48 m (14.7 ft)
- Barrel length: 3.92 m (12 ft 10 in) L/37.33
- Width: 2.1 m (6 ft 11 in)
- Height: 2.8 m (9 ft 2 in)
- Crew: 8 (including driver)
- Caliber: 105 mm (4.1 in)
- Breech: Horizontal sliding block
- Recoil: Constant, hydropneumatic
- Elevation: -5° to 65° (-89 mils to 1,156 mils)
- Traverse: ±23° (±409 mils)
- Rate of fire: 15 rds/min maximum 3–5 rds/min sustained
- Muzzle velocity: 662 m/s (2,170 ft/s)
- Maximum firing range: 14.7 km (9.1 mi) HE; 18 km (11 mi) RAP

The KH178 ("Korean Howitzer 1 (First) 78") is a South Korean 105 mm 38 caliber towed howitzer. It was designed and developed by the Agency for Defense Development (ADD) for the Republic of Korea Armed Forces and manufactured by Hyundai WIA.

== History ==
In 1976, the plan for a domestic 105 mm howitzer design was scrapped, and the factories began preparing for mass production of KM101A1 with assistance from the United States. In June, South Korea continued its development work by importing two newly introduced British 105mm L118 light guns (an air-portable towed howitzer) for evaluation. In 1977, the mass production of KM101 began and South Korea quickly boosted manufacturing capacity. In March 1978, South Korea obtained partial blueprints of the West German 105 mm lightweight howitzer and produced an operational sample, which contributed to the further development of the new howitzer. After a series of technical breakthroughs South Korea launched the developed KH178 105 mm howitzer to replace the M101.

Since KH178 is based on the technology of M101A1, South Korea requires US approval but does not pay license fees when exporting.

By the time KH178 began development, NATO members were fielding artillery such as the 155mm FH70 and M198 howitzer developed under a Joint Ballistics Memorandum of Understanding standard—increasing maximum firing range to 30 km. Due to changing battlefield environment and to support joint operations with the US, the Republic of Korea Armed Forces started development of the KH179 155 mm towed howitzer in 1979. The decision led to continuation of mass production of KM101A1 rather than KH178 for cost efficiency. Since 1983, only 21 KH178 howitzers were delivered to the Army and the Marine Corps. All howitzers were retired in 2000.

== Design ==
The overall characteristic is similar to the M101A1 howitzer. KH178 is designed as a division artillery for a counter-battery role with agile positioning benefited from its light weight. The howitzer has a longer 38 caliber progressive twist rifling barrel, which provides a longer range of 14.7 km (9.1 mi) with standard ammunition and 18 km (11 mi) with RAP ammunition—compared to 22 caliber with EFC of 7,500 rounds.

The cannon is made up of a tube, breech mechanism, muzzle brake, and locking ring. The tube is made of high strength alloy steel, heat-treated and autofrettaged to provide maximum life. The firing mechanism is a continuous pull (self-cocking) type. The weapon is fired by pulling a lanyard. It returns to firing position when releasing a lanyard. The carriage is single axle and split trail. The trails spread at emplacement, but draw together and lock for travel.

The carriage consists of an equilibrator, shield, elevating mechanism, cradle, traversing mechanism, top carriage, wheels and trails. The carriage traversal is a screw type. The recoil mechanism is a hydro-pneumatic system that absorbs the energy/recoils by forcing oil through orifices and returns the gun to ready by compressed gas. It is installed in the cradle of the carriage and attached to the cradle and the barrel. The gun maintains traverse of ±23° (±409 mils) for easier direct fire targeting during close combat, which frequently occurred during the Korean War.

Indirect fire instruments includes the panoramic telescope KM12A8 and telescope mount KM21A2. Direct fire instruments includes the elbow telescope KM16A2, and fire control range quadrant KM4A3.

The howitzer has an elevation of -5° (-89 mils) to 65° (1,156 mils) to engage enemies from higher position, and can fire both anti-personnel and anti-tank ammunitions. It can fire maximum of 15 rds/min or 3 to 5 rds/min for sustain.

KH178MK1 has GPS and inertial navigation for faster operation and improved accuracy.

== Operators ==
Map of operators of KH178

=== Current operators ===
- Chile: 16 howitzers in 1991, used by the Chilean Marine Corps.
- Fiji: 6 howitzers granted by South Korea in 2014 to replace Ordnance QF 25-pounders to use as ceremonial guns.
- Indonesia: 54 howitzers in 2010.
- South Korea: 21 howitzers used by the Republic of Korea Army and the Republic of Korea Marine Corps. All retired in 2000. 6 transferred to Fiji in 2014.

== See also ==
- KH179 howitzer
- M101 howitzer
- L118 light gun
- M119 howitzer
