= KMS114 81 mm mortar =

81 mm Mortar
- Type: infantry mortar
- Place of origin: Republic of Korea

Service history
- In service: from 2021

Production history
- Designer: Hyundai WIA
- Manufacturer: Hyundai WIA

Specifications
- Mass: Total 34 kg(Barrel, Bipod, Base plate)

The 81 mm mortar KMS-114 is a South Korean infantry mortar, one of the weapon systems operated by the infantry battalion. The mortar system is made up of a light mortar (KM-114), a digital compass (GYG-14K), a digital calculator (PYK-14K), a digital communication device (PYT-14K), a forward observer device (TAS-14K) and a loading and carrying vehicle.

== Development ==
The Republic of Korea Army completed the development of the KMS-114 in 2019. The army has been deploying the mortar since 2021. It has been developed by integrating equipment operated by the forward observer (FO), the fire direction center (FDC) and the mortar squad. As a result, the mortar has reduced weight compared to the previous 81 mm mortar KM-187, simplified firing procedure and improved mobility.

== Features ==
The mortar (KMS-114) is made up of a tube, bipod and base plate. KMS-114 reduced its weight by 19%(42 kg → 34 kg) compared to the KM-187, lowering the risk of fatigue and injury for soldiers. The KMS-114 digitizes and automates target observation and acquisition, firing data calculation and data transmission methods that were manually operated in existing mortars (KM-187), and replaces the sight unit (KF812) to apply digital compass (GYG-14K). As a result, the firing procedures was simplified, with reduced firing preparation time and decreased number of operating soldiers. To improve mobility, vehicles have been developed to carry operating soldiers, their equipment and ammunition.

== Ammunition ==
HE(K247, KM374), ILL(KM301A3), TP(K249), 훈련탄(M68), 축사탄(M744M747)
