= HM-41 =

Iranian 155 mm towed howitzer

HM-41 155mm Howitzer
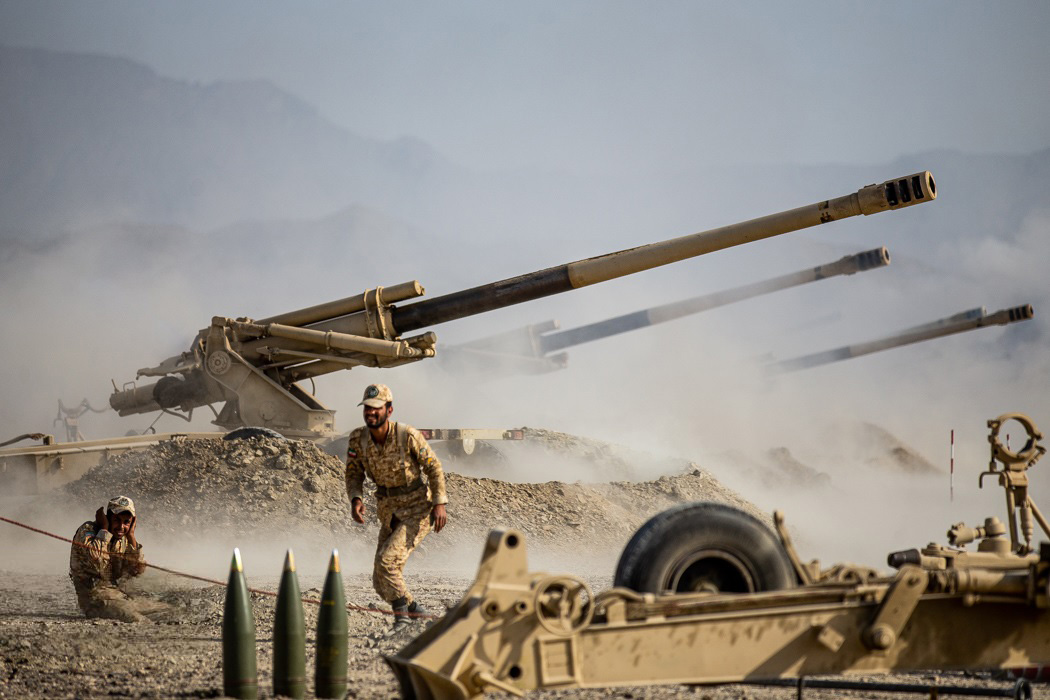
- The HM-41 during the Zulfiqar 1400 exercise.
- Type: Howitzer
- Place of origin: Iran

Service history
- Used by: Iran

Production history
- Manufacturer: Defense Industries Organization

Specifications
- Mass: 6,890 kg (15,190 lb)
- Caliber: 155 mm (6.1 in)
- Recoil: Hydro-pneumatic
- Carriage: tripod
- Elevation: 0° to 66°
- Traverse: 25° right, 23.5° left
- Rate of fire: 4 round per minute
- Effective firing range: 22 km (14 mi)
- Maximum firing range: 30–34 km (19–21 mi) (with rocket-assisted ammunition)

The HM-41 is an Iranian 155 mm howitzer based on the South Korean KH179, which was sold to Iran during the Iran–Iraq War. It has a 155 mm/39 caliber barrel with a muzzle brake to lessen the recoil.

The HM-41 has been offered for export, but no country is known to be using it except Iran.

== Development ==
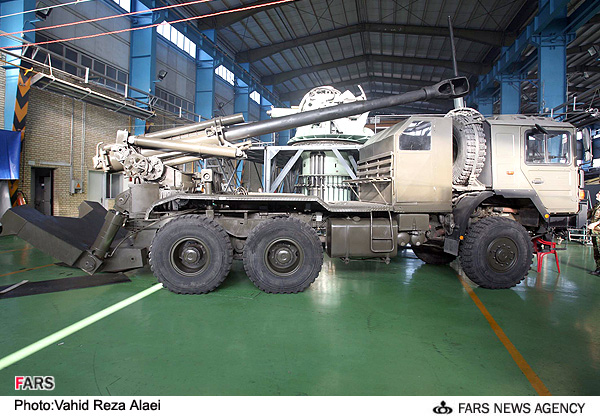
HM-41 Howitzer

A wheeled self-propelled version was reported to be under development. The first prototype was finished in 2011.

In 2012, Iran unveiled laser guided Basir 155 mm artillery shells which were tested by an HM 41 howitzer. In 2017, a new version of the Iranian-made 155mm self-propelled howitzer dubbed (Ashura) is based on a 6x6 IVECO Trakker truck chassis using the same HM-41 towed howitzer mounted at the rear of the truck.

== Design ==
According to Iranian sources, the HM-41 weighs 6,890 kg, the same weight as the South Korean KH179. The HM-41's main components are also very similar in appearance to the KH179's CN79 barrel, RM79 recoil buffer, and CG79 mount and firing a rocket-assisted High-Explosive (HE) projectile, a maximum range of 30 km can be achieved. Firing an unassisted HE projectile, a maximum range of 22 km can be obtained.

== Users ==
- Iran
