= KH179 =

South Korean 155 mm towed howitzer

KH179 155 mm towed howitzer
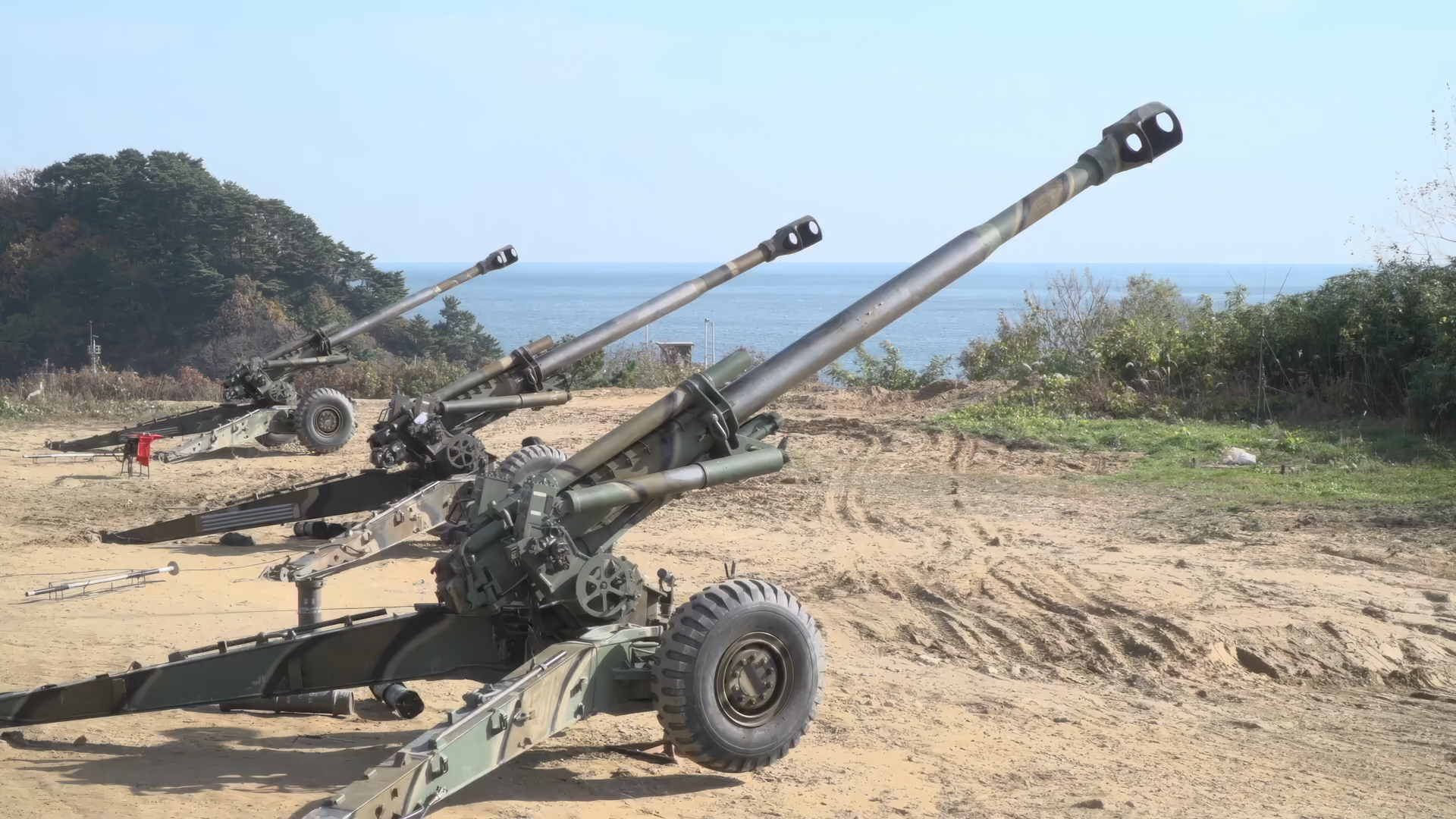
- KH179 155 mm howitzer
- Type: Towed howitzer
- Place of origin: South Korea

Service history
- In service: 1983–present
- Used by: See Operators
- Wars: Iran–Iraq War

Production history
- Designer: Agency for Defense Development
- Designed: 1979–1982
- Manufacturer: Kia Machine Tool (1983–1996); Kia Heavy Industry (1996–2001); WIA (2001–2009); Hyundai WIA (2009–present)
- Unit cost: ₩120 million (2017)
- Produced: 1983–present

Specifications
- Mass: 6,890 kg (15,190 lb)
- Length: Travel: 10.389 m (30 ft)
- Barrel length: 7.08 m (23 ft 3 in) L/45
- Width: Travel: 2.44 m (8 ft)
- Height: Travel: 2.36 m (7 ft 9 in)
- Crew: 10
- Caliber: 155 mm (6.1 in)
- Breech: Interrupted screw
- Recoil: Variable, hydropneumatic, independent
- Elevation: 1,220 mils
- Traverse: ±448 mils
- Rate of fire: 4 rds/min (maximum); 2 rds/min (sustain)
- Muzzle velocity: 913 m/s (3,000 ft/s)
- Maximum firing range: 17.7 km (K305, DP-ICM); 18 km (M107, HE); 28 km (K310, BB/DP-ICM); 30 km (M549A1, HE-RAP)

The KH179 ("Korean howitzer 1 (first) 79") is a South Korean 155 mm towed howitzer of length 39 calibers, designed and developed by the Agency for Defense Development (ADD) for the Republic of Korea Armed Forces, and is now manufactured by Hyundai WIA.

== Development ==
The KH179 is a towed howitzer developed and produced by Kia Precision Industry (now Hyundai WIA) since 1983 for the purpose of replacing the U.S. M114A2 towed howitzer and enhancing artillery firepower.

== General characteristics ==
The KH179 makes use of lightweight components (CN79 barrel, RM79 recoil buffer, and CG79 mount) and can be air-transported by CH-47 chinook helicopter and C-130 transport aircraft. In addition, performance improvements were made in range, reliability, and maintenance compared to conventional M114A2 howitzers operated by the South Korean military. The ammunition used in the KH179 is compatible with NATO 155 mm standard ammunition, but has significantly improved range and firepower.

It is equipped with a direct/indirect aiming mirror, allowing both direct and indirect howitzer firing. Direct fire uses an L-type aiming mirror with 3.5 magnification and has an effective range of 1,500 m. Indirect shooting uses a four-magnification panoramic aim mirror mounted on the left. The range is 18.1 km for normal rounds, 30 km for rocket-assisted rounds, and the firing rate is 2 rounds per minute for continuous shots, and the maximum firing rate is 4 rounds per minute.

== Operational history ==
The KH179 was initially deployed in 1983 to replace the U.S. M114A2 towed howitzer and its Korean-produced copy KH114A1 in frontline service by the Republic of Korea Army. An unknown number of units were purchased by Iran during the Iran-Iraq War to complement their existing stock of M114 howitzers.

== Operators ==
Map of operators of KH179 or its variants

- Indonesia : 18 for the Indonesian Army, purchased in 2011. Stationed in three batteries in Berau, East Kalimantan; in Ngabang, West Kalimantan and in Aceh, north Sumatera (each with 6 pieces).
- Iran : Unknown quantity purchased during Iran–Iraq War. Later copied and produced locally as HM-41.
- Myanmar : More than 100 in service with the Myanmar Army.
- South Korea : 1,000 in service with the Republic of Korea Army and the Republic of Korea Marine Corps.

== See also ==
- KH178: Related development
- HM-41: Iranian copy
- M114: Related development
- M198: United States 155 mm howitzer
