= 105 mm calibre =

Common type of artillery and tank gun caliber

105 mm (4.1 in) is a common NATO-standard artillery and tank gun calibre. The rifled tank round is defined by STANAG 4458. The artillery round is defined by AOP-29 part 3 with reference to STANAG 4425.

== Artillery ==
Since the early 21st century, most NATO armies have settled on 155 mm (6.1 in) weapons as having a good compromise between range and destructive power whilst having a single calibre, which simplifies logistics; however some military forces have retained 105 mm (4.1 in) towed howitzers for their lighter weight and greater portability, including their rapid airlift and airdrop capabilities. The lower power and shorter range of 105 mm (4.1 in) ammunition has led to its obsolescence in full-sized self-propelled guns, such as the American M108 howitzer and British FV433 Abbot SPG. China, North Korea, Russia, and other former Soviet bloc countries use 122 mm (4.8 in) and 130 mm (5.1 in) calibre weapons in similar roles.

=== 105 mm artillery guns ===
- FV433 Abbot SPG (United Kingdom)
- G7 howitzer (South Africa)
- GIAT LG1 (France)
- Indian field gun (India)
- K105A1 105 mm self-propelled howitzer (EVO-105) (South Korea)
- KH178 105 mm howitzer (South Korea)
- L118 light gun (United Kingdom) / M119 howitzer (United States)
- M-56 howitzer (Serbia)
- M101 howitzer (United States)
- M102 howitzer (United States)
- M108 howitzer (United States)
- Mk 61 105 mm self-propelled howitzer (France)
- MKE Boran howitzer (Turkey)
- OTO Melara Mod 56 (Italy)
- Type 74 105 mm self-propelled howitzer (Japan)

== Tank guns ==
During the Cold War, the concept of the main battle tank was established and guns of 105 mm (4.1 in) (NATO) and 100 mm (3.9 in) (Warsaw Pact) were the standard until the advent of guns of 120 mm (4.7 in) (NATO) and 125 mm (4.9 in) (Warsaw Pact) from the 1960s to the 1990s. The L7 was widely used by NATO countries, and with it was popularized the now-standard 105×617mmR round, still used both in lighter-weight applications such as the Stingray light tank and the Stryker Mobile Gun System, as well as older MBTs such as the M60 tank.

=== 105 mm tank guns ===
- CN 105 F1 (France)
- CN 105-57 (France)
- Cockerill 105 HP Gun (Belgium)
- Elbit Systems Land 105/52 (Israel)
- M68 tank gun (United States)
- M35 (United States)
- Leonardo 105/52 (Italy)
- Royal Ordnance L7 (United Kingdom)
- 10.5 cm KwK L/68 (Nazi Germany)

== Anti-aircraft guns ==
The 105 was not a common calibre for land-based anti-aircraft guns, but several naval dual-use guns of this calibre saw common use.

=== 105 mm anti-aircraft guns ===
- 10.5 cm Flak 38 (Nazi Germany)
- QF 4-inch naval gun Mk V (United Kingdom)
- QF 4-inch naval gun Mk XVI (United Kingdom)
- 105 mm gun M3 (United States)
