= MKE Boran 105 mm howitzer =

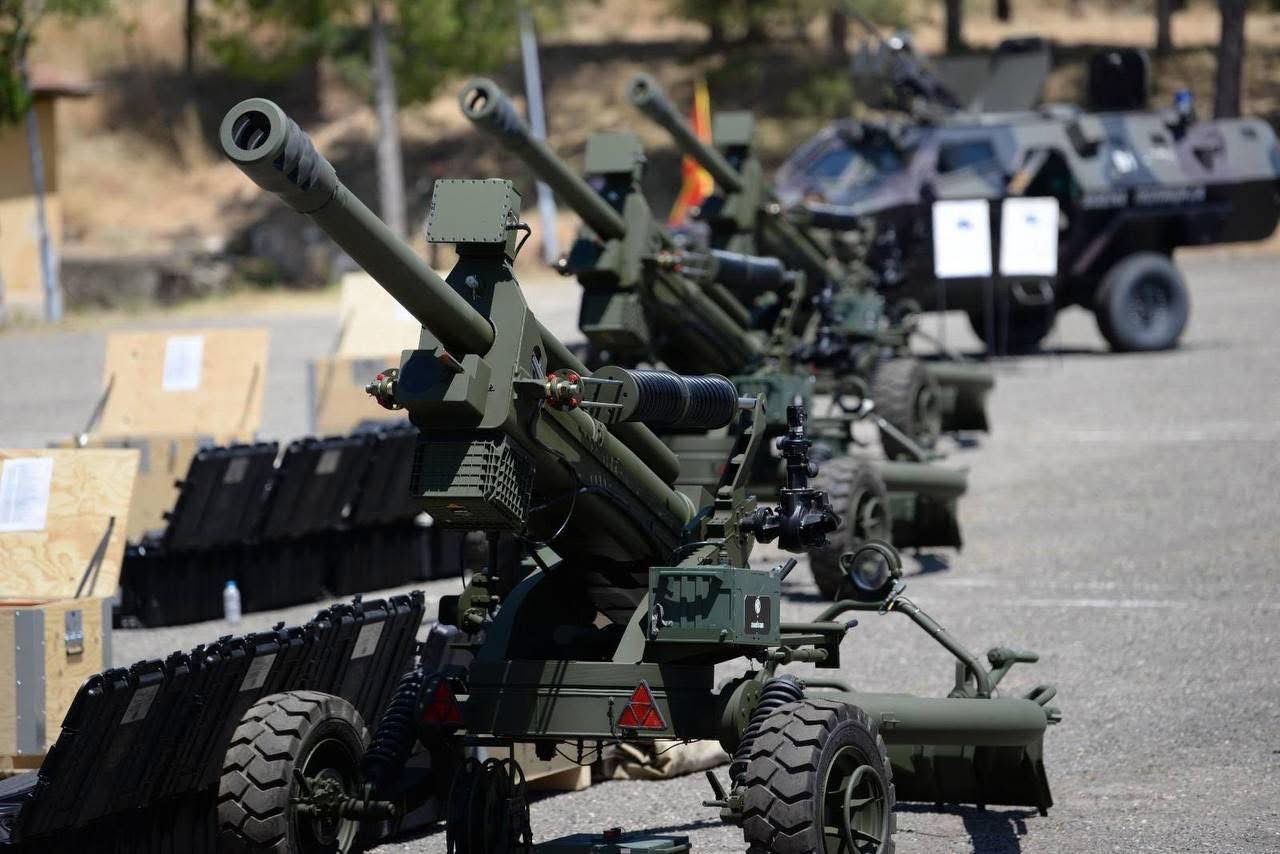
- A row of newly acquired MKE Boran 105mm lightweight towed howitzers displayed during a public presentation event organized by the Ministry of Defence of the Republic of Macedonia in 2025.
- Type: Air-transportable lightweight towed howitzer
- Place of origin: Turkey

Service history
- In service: 2021–present
- Used by: Turkish Land Forces; Bangladesh Army; Army of North Macedonia; Albanian Land Forces

Production history
- Manufacturer: Mechanical and Chemical Industry Corporation (MKE); Aselsan (fire control system and electronics)

Specifications
- Mass: 1,745 kg (3,847 lb) (including fire control system)
- Barrel length: L/30
- Crew: 5
- Caliber: 105 mm (4.13 in)
- Elevation: -3° to +70°
- Traverse: 8° left or right
- Rate of fire: 6 rpm
- Maximum firing range: Conventional HE projectile: 17,000 m (11 mi)
- Sights: VOLKAN 230/105 FCS: Direct fire sight system (DFSS), Inertial navigation system (INS), Muzzle velocity radar (MVR), Laser rangefinder

The MKE Boran is a lightweight air-transportable 105 mm towed howitzer, equipped with modern fire-control system (FCS) and navigation system, made by the Turkish company MKE.

== History ==
MKE launched the 105 mm air transportable light towed howitzer (Boran) project to fulfill the operational requests of the Commando and Infantry units for Airborne Operations. The system can calculate its own position and identify targets without usual deployment procedures thanks to its modern command and fire control systems. It has a maximum range of 17 km (11 mi) and 6400 NATO mils (360°) firing capability. The howitzer weights around 1,800 kg (4,000 lb) and can be airlifted with a medium-lift utility helicopter and deployed in a short time for fire missions. Based on L118.

== Technical specifications ==
Its fire control system (FCS) Volkan 230/105 and navigation systems are made by another Turkish company Aselsan. The BORAN can be towed by vehicles or airlifted via helicopters such as the UH-60 Black Hawk and Mil Mi-17.

== Operators ==
=== Current operators ===
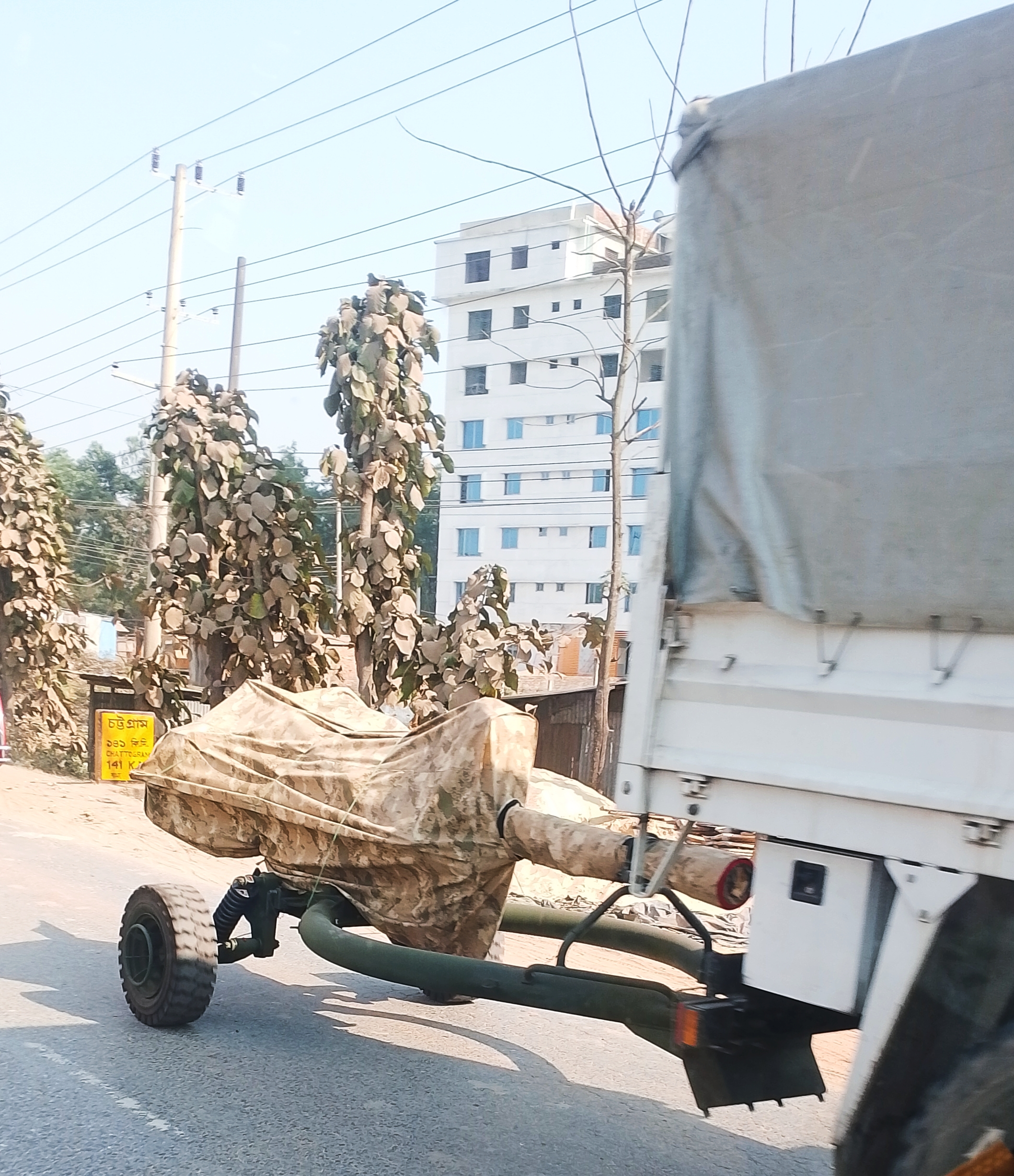
A Boran 105 mm howitzer in Bangladeshi service.

- Albania
  - Albanian Land Forces: 6
- Bangladesh
  - Bangladesh Army: 18
- North Macedonia
  - Army of North Macedonia7/18 on order
- Turkey
  - Turkish Land Forces
