= M864 =

American 155 mm base-bleed DPICM artillery projectile

M864 DPICM
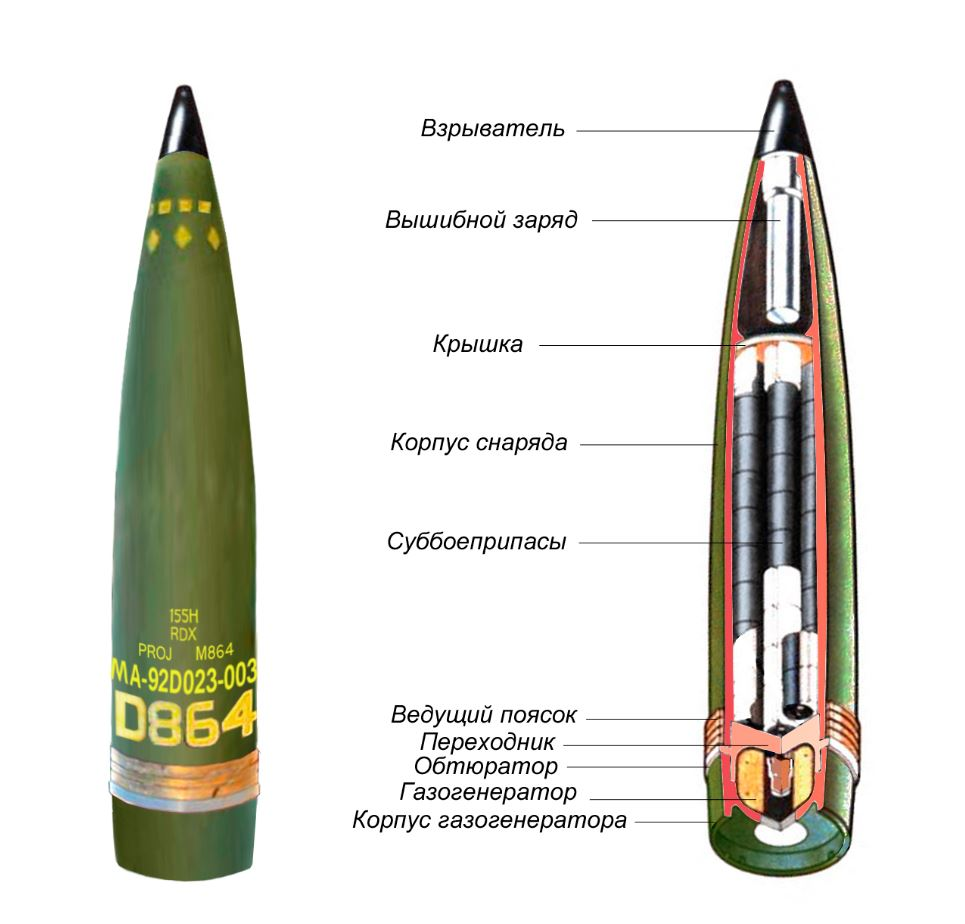
- Russian language diagram
- Type: Base bleed, extended-range, base-ejection cargo artillery projectile
- Place of origin: United States

Service history
- In service: Since 1987

Production history
- Designed: 1980s
- Manufacturer: General Dynamics Ordnance and Tactical Systems
- Variants: M864A1

Specifications
- Mass: 102 lb (46.3 kg) unfuzed
- Length: 36 in (920 mm) fused
- Diameter: 155 mm (6.1 in)
- Muzzle velocity: 2,700 ft/s (830 m/s)
- Maximum firing range: 18.3 mi (29.4 km) (Note: The range of 18.3 mi (29.4 km) is achieved when fired from the 39‐caliber barrels of the M109A6 Paladin and FH70.)
- Filling: 48 x M42 dual‐purpose grenades; 24 x M46 dual‐purpose grenades
- Filling weight: M42 – 7.3 oz (208 g) each; M46 – 7.5 oz (213 g) each
- References: Janes

The M864 is an American made 155 mm artillery shell. It carries a DPICM warhead and incorporates base bleed technology to increase its range. The projectile is capable of delivering 24 M46 and 48 M42 dual-purpose anti-materiel/anti-personnel sub-munitions at ranges out to 29 kilometers. Base bleed technology was developed to reduce the amount of base drag on a projectile, thereby increasing the achieved range. The drag is reduced by a gas generator located on the base of the projectile. Once ignited, the gas generator bleeds hot gas into the projectile's wake, which causes the flow of air at the base to be less turbulent. The decrease in turbulence reduces base drag, which typically accounts for 50 percent of total drag. The amount of thrust produced by the base burner unit is negligible and does not serve the same function as the rocket motor on a rocket-assisted projectile (RAP).

The M864 projectile is not ballistically matched to any projectile currently in the inventory, but because of the similarity of the trajectories, firing data for the M864 can be determined from M549A1 firing data.

== See also ==
- Dual-purpose improved conventional munition
- Lists of artillery
- List of crew-served weapons of the U.S. Armed Forces
