= 155 mm caliber =

Common type of artillery calibre

"155 mm" is a very widely used calibre (barrel internal diameter) for artillery guns and their corresponding artillery shells.

== Land warfare ==
=== Historic calibres ===
==== France - 1874 ====
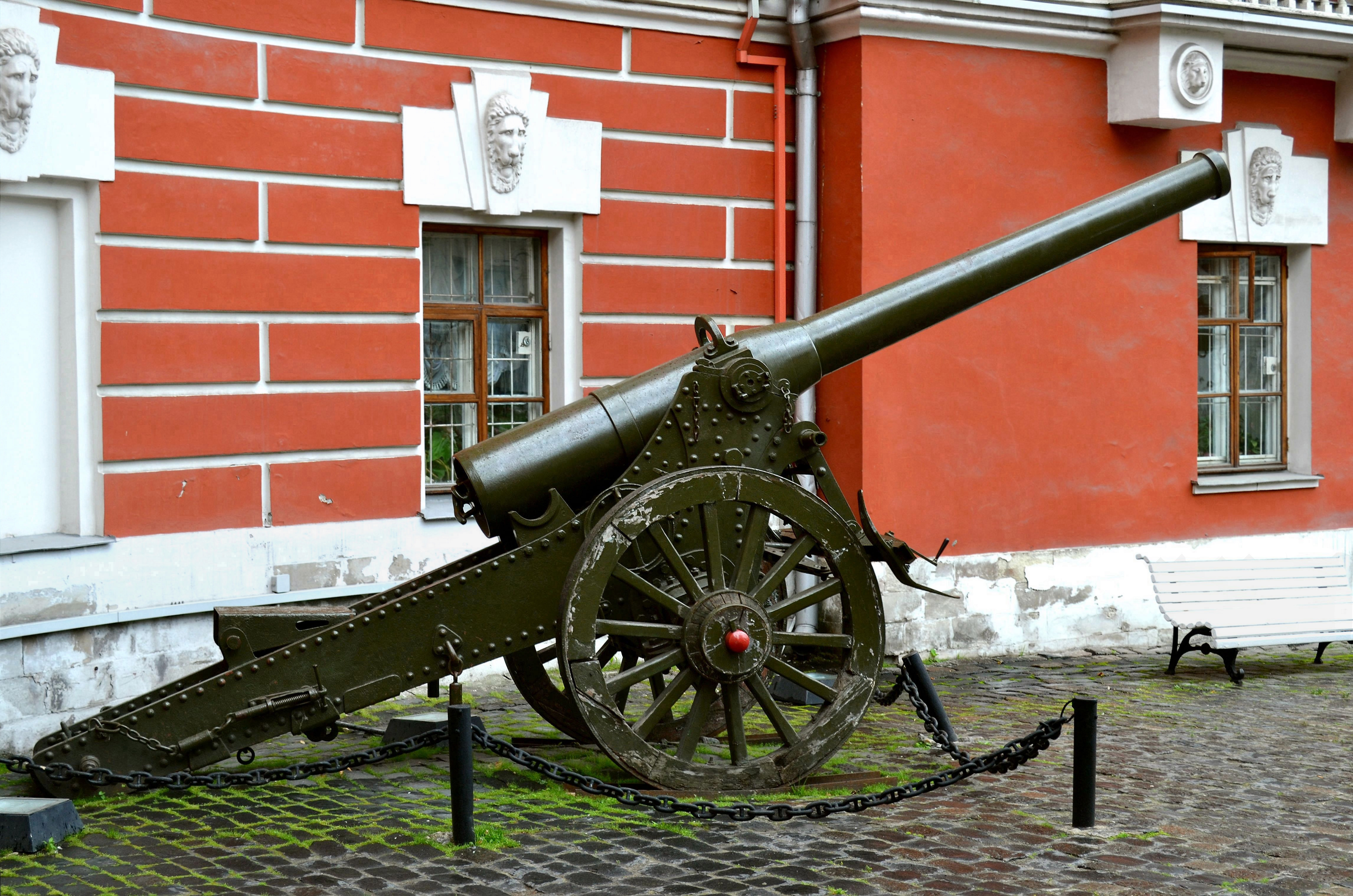
155-mm De Bange canon Mle 1877

The 155 mm (6.1 in) caliber originated in France after the Franco-Prussian War (1870–1871).

A French artillery committee met on 2 February 1874 to discuss new models for French fortress and siege artillery, among which there was a weapon in the 140 to 160 mm (5.5 to 6.3 in) calibre range.

After several meetings, on 16 April 1874 the committee settled on the 155 mm (6.1 in) calibre, and led to the De Bange 155 mm cannon.

=== NATO standard ===
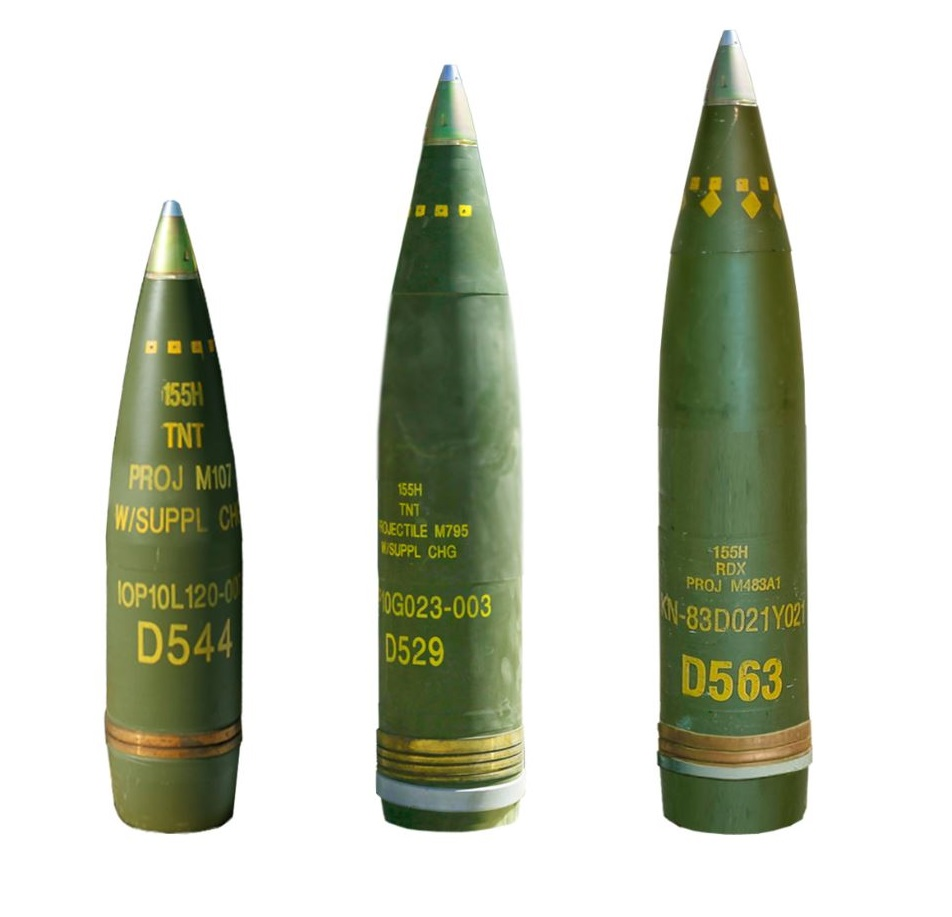
M107, M795, M483A1 155 mm projectiles

Among the existing and the former 155 mm artillery shells, there is one that has been standardised by NATO under both the AOP-29 part 1 (in reference to STANAG 4425), and under the JBMoU (Joint Ballistics Memorandum of Understanding). This standard defines a standard 155 mm projectile with a 23 litre combustion chamber volume.

NATO is now pushing from standardised artillery shell to sharable ammunition. The standard described above enables the use of NATO shells in all NATO guns. But they still need to be qualified on each gun to control the performances (ballistic characteristics) and safety.

==== Retirement of other calibres ====
This has led to the obsolescence of larger caliber artillery shells such as the 175 and 203 mm (6.9 and 8.0 in). Some militaries continue to retain the smaller 105 mm (4.1 in) weapons for their light weight and greater portability. Russia and some former Soviet states use 122, 130, and 152 mm (4.8, 5.1, and 6.0 in) artillery in similar roles.

== Naval warfare ==
Since the end of World War II, the 155 mm (6.1 in) caliber has not found any use among naval forces despite its ubiquity on land with most NATO and aligned navies using 76 mm (3.0 in), 100 mm (3.9 in), 114 mm (4.5 in), or 127 mm (5.0 in) guns on modern warships. At one point the British Ministry of Defence studied "up-gunning" the Royal Navy's 4.5 inch Mark 8 naval guns to give increased firepower and a common caliber between the Royal Navy and the British Army. Despite superficially appearing to be inferior based on a simple comparison of round diameters, when firing conventional ammunition the smaller, 4.5 inch Mark 8 naval gun is comparable to the standard 155 mm (6.1 in) gun-howitzer of the British Army. The standard shell from a 4.5 inch Mark 8 naval gun has the same, if not better, range. Only by using rocket-assisted projectiles (RAPs) can most 155 mm (6.1 in) guns have comparable range to the 4.5 inch Mark 8 naval gun and by doing so there is a reduction in the payload. This is because naval guns can be built much more strongly than land-based self-propelled gun-howitzers, and have much longer barrels in relation to caliber (for example the 4.5 inch Mark 8 naval gun has a barrel length of 55 calibers, while the standard AS-90 self-propelled gun has a barrel length of 39 calibers). This allows naval guns to fire heavier shells in comparison to shell diameter and to use larger propellant charges in relation to shell weight, leading to greater projectile velocities. Even without active cooling, the heavier naval gun barrels allow a faster sustained rate of fire than field guns, and this is exploited with an autoloading system with a capacity of several hundred rounds. The 155 mm (6.1 in) is better than the 4.5 inch Mark 8 naval gun for firing cannon-launched guided projectiles (CLGP) as the lower velocity of the 155 mm (6.1 in) shell makes it much easier for the projectiles' internal electronic guidance systems to survive being fired.

While the US Navy's Advanced Gun System (AGS) also uses a 155 mm (6.1 in) caliber, it is not compatible with NATO-standard 155 mm (6.1 in) ammunition. Only one type of ammunition was ever developed and procurement was discontinued in 2016 due to its high cost, making the AGS unusable.

== 155 mm guns ==
=== Current ===
==== NATO and allies ====
- Finland
  - 155 K 83
  - 155 GH 52 APU
- France
  - CAESAR
  - GCT
- Germany
  - Artillery Gun Module
  - PzH 2000
- Germany / United Kingdom / Italy
  - FH70
- Israel
  - SIGMA 155
  - ATMOS 2000
  - Soltam M-71
- Italy
  - Palmaria
- Japan
  - Type 99
  - Type 19
- Poland
  - AHS Krab
- South Korea
  - K9 Thunder
  - KH179
- Singapore
  - FH-2000
  - SLWH Pegasus
  - SSPH Primus
- Slovakia
  - 155 mm SpGH Zuzana
- Spain
  - Santa Bárbara Sistemas 155/52
- Sweden
  - Archer artillery system
  - FH77
- Turkey
  - Panter howitzer
- Turkey / South Korea
  - T-155 Fırtına
- Ukraine
  - 2S22 Bohdana
  - 2P22 Bohdana
- United Kingdom
  - AS-90
- United Kingdom / United States
  - M777
- United States
  - M109 howitzer
  - M114 howitzer
  - M198 howitzer

==== Other countries ====
Compatible with NATO projectiles:

- India
  - Dhanush
  - ATAGS
  - Bharat-52
  - MArG 155-BR
- Russia
  - 2S19M1-155 – the 155 mm export version
- Serbia
  - Nora B-52

Unknown compatibility:

- China
  - WAC-21
  - PLZ-45
  - PLZ-05
  - PCL-181
- South Africa
  - G5
  - G6

=== Historic ===
- France
  - GPF 155 mm
  - St. Chamond 155 mm
  - Schneider 155 mm
  - Obusier de 155 mm Modèle 50
  - TRF1
- Israel
  - Soltam M-68
- Japan
  - Type 75
- Serbia
  - Nora B-52
- Singapore
  - FH-88
- Sweden
  - Bandkanon 1
- United States
  - M1/M2 155 mm "Long Tom"
  - M12
  - M41
  - M44
  - M53

=== Experimental or prototype-only ===
- United States
  - XM1203 (five prototypes built)
  - XM2001 (one prototype built). Both never entered service
  - M1299 (20 prototypes built)
- Poland
  - AHS Kryl – one prototype built, never entered service

== 155 mm naval guns ==
=== NATO compatible ===
- Germany: Modular Naval Artillery Concept (MONARC) – proposed but never produced
- United Kingdom: 155 mm (6.1") Future Naval Gun – proposed but never produced

=== Not NATO compatible ===
- Empire of Japan: 15.5 cm/60 3rd Year Type naval gun
- France: Canon de 155 mm Modèle 1920
- United States: Advanced Gun System (AGS) – in limited service, but with no ammunition available

== 155 mm shells ==
| Country of origin | Name | Service | Notes |
|---|---|---|---|
| China | WS-35 | 2012–current | A family of guided artillery projectiles developed for the People's Liberation Army (PLA). The WS-35B has a base bleed unit, the PLA claim the range to be 30, 40 and 50 km (19, 25 and 31 mi) from 39-, 45- and 52-calibre barrelled howitzers. The WS-35R is a rocket-assisted projectile, the PLA claim the range to be 35, 45 and 60 km (22, 28 and 37 mi) from 39-, 45- and 52-calibre barrelled howitzers. |
| France | OE 155 56/69 | 1959–1990s | A high explosive projectile developed for the Mk F3 155 mm and used various French howitzers until replaced by the OE 155 F1 HE. |
| France | OE 155 F1 HE | 1990–current | A high-explosive fragmentation projectile. Maximum range is 24 km (15 mi) from the 40-caliber barrel of the TRF1 howitzer, or 30.4 km (18.9 mi) when fitted with a base bleed unit. |
| Germany | DM121 (Rh30) and DM131 (Rh40) | 2002–current | The DM121 (also known as the Rh30) is an explosive projectiles developed for the PzH 2000 but compatible with any 155 mm NATO howitzer, the DM131 (also known as the Rh40) is similar but features a base bleed unit. Maximum range of the DM121 is 24.7 and 30.1 km (15.3 and 18.7 mi) respectively from 39- and 52-calibre barrelled howitzers. Maximum range of the DM131 is 30 and 40 km (19 and 25 mi) respectively from 39- and 52-calibre barrelled howitzers. |
| Germany | SMArt 155 | 2000–current | A carrier shell with two anti-armour and anti-artillery submunitions. Maximum range of 22.5 km (14.0 mi) from a 39-calibre howitzer and 27.5 km (17.1 mi) from a 52-calibre howitzer. |
| Germany | DM662 DPICM with M85 or DM1385 bomblet | In service (Finland) | DM662 is a 155 mm artillery shell based cluster munition projectile, which contains 49 bomblets. This was produced by Rheinmetall with DM1385 High Explosive Dual Purpose (Anti armour and Anti personnel) bomblets and also was produced by Norway with license, however this utilized Israeli M85 HEDP bomblet. Norwegian tests indicate 1,11% failure rate of the explosive while Finnish tests (DM1385) indicate 0,2%, currently this munition is only stored by Finland for wartime use. |
| Israel | M395 DPICM, M396 and M397 ER DPICM | 2007–current | A series of dual-purpose improved conventional munition (DPICM) carrier shells which carry M85 dual-purpose (anti-personnel and anti-armour) bomblets. The M395 projectile carries 63 bomblets to a maximum range of 22.4 km (13.9 mi); the extended range M396 and M397 projectiles both carry only 49 bomblets and have a base bleed unit to a maximum range of 28.7 and 30 km (17.8 and 18.6 mi) respectively. |
| Israel | M401 and M401-A1 HE-ER | In service | High-Explosive Extended Range (HE-ER) projectiles fitted with base bleed units. Maximum range is 30, 36 and 40 km (19, 22 and 25 mi) respectively from 39-, 45- and 52-calibre barrelled howitzers. |
| Israel | M454 (IMI) HE Frag | 2005–current | A High-Explosive Fragmentation (HE-Frag) projectile with airburst capability for use against dismounted infantry as well as soft-skinned and light armoured vehicles. Maximum range is 22, 26 and 28 km (14, 16 and 17 mi) respectively from 39-, 45- and 52-calibre barrelled howitzers. |
| Italy / Germany | Vulcano HE | 2017–current | A family of long-range subcalibre High-Explosive projectiles. It comprises the BER (ballistic extended range) unguided multirole projectile with a multifunction programmable fuze, and the GLR (guided long range) projectile with GPS-aided IMU guidance, canard control and optional semi-active laser terminal seeker. Maximum range of the BER is 50 and 70 km (31 and 43 mi) when fired from 39 or 52-calibre howitzers. Maximum range of the GLR is 57 and 80 km (35 and 50 mi) from 39 or 52-calibre howitzers. |
| Norway | Nammo ER projectiles | 2018–current | A family of extended range (ER) projectiles development by Nammo, including the high explosive, illuminating and smoke projectiles. The projectiles are machined inside and out to achieve a streamlined shape and consistency of weight distribution, increasing range and accuracy. With a hollow-base maximum range is 22 and 32 km (14 and 20 mi) respectively from 39- and 52-calibre barrelled howitzers, when fitted with a base bleed unit this increases to 30 and 41 km (19 and 25 mi) respectively. |
| Poland | APR 155 | Development | A laser-guided high-explosive incendiary projectile with a maximum range of 20 km (12 mi) designed to be used with AHS Kryl and AHS Krab 155 mm self-propelled howitzers. Is based on Ukrainian 152 mm Kvitnyk projectile. |
| Russia | Krasnopol | 1987-current | A series of laser-guided projectiles primarily produced in the Eastern Bloc standard 152 mm (6 in) caliber, they are also produced in 155 mm caliber for the export market. First fielded by the Soviet Army in 1987, they are regarded as the Eastern Bloc equivalent of the US M712 Copperhead. The 152 mm versions have a maximum range of 20 km (12 mi) from the D-20 gun-howitzer and 22 km (14 mi) from the longer-barrelled 2A65 Msta-B. They are licence produced in China by Norinco. |
| South Africa | M1 ERFB | 1970s-current | Extended Range Full Bore (ERFB) projectiles developed from the work of Gerald Bull and his Space Research Corporation. They are produced in two versions, standard boat-tail (ERFB-BT) and base bleed (ERFB-BB). Maximum range from a 45-calibre barrelled howitzer in 30.9 and 39.1 km (19.2 and 24.3 mi) respectively for the boat-tail and base bleed projectiles. |
| South Africa | M9 ERFB | 2000-current | An improved version of the M1 ERFB projectiles, they designed to be fired from 52-caibre barrelled versions of the G5 and G6 howitzers. Maximum range is 40 and 50 km (25 and 31 mi) respectively for the boat-tail and base bleed projectiles. |
| South Africa | M2005 Assegai | 2017-current | Velocity-enhanced Long-range Artillery Projectile (V-LAP) HE projectile incorporating both base bleed and rocket-assistance for increased ranges. Maximum range of 45 km (28 mi) from a 39-calibre barrel and 60 km (37 mi) from a 52-calibre barrel, it is expected to achieve a maximum range of 70 km (43 mi) from the latter. |
| South Korea | K305 DPICM | 1980s-current | A dual-purpose improved conventional munition with a maximum range of 17.4 km (10.8 mi) when fired from the KH179. |
| South Korea | K307 BB HE | 1999-current | Base bleed high explosive projectile developed to be fired from South Korean 155 mm howitzers. Maximum range of 41 km (25 mi) when fired from the K9 Thunder. |
| South Korea | K310 BB DPICM | 2001-current | A base bleed dual-purpose improved conventional munition with a maximum range of 36 km (22 mi) when fired from the K9 Thunder. |
| South Korea | K315 HE-RAP | 2024-current | Rocket-assisted projectile with a maximum range of 54 km (34 mi) when fired from the K9 Thunder. |
| South Korea | K315 ERM | | A K315 extended range munition (ERM) developed with a smaller TNT charge and a stronger solid fuel propellant with a maximum range of 60 km (37 mi). |
| Spain | ER02A1 | 1999-current | A projectile that can be equipped either with a tapering boat-tail or a base bleed unit; it comes in high-explosive, smoke generating and illuminating versions. Maximum range from a 39-calibre howitzer is 24 km (15 mi) boat-tail or 30 km (19 mi) base bleed; from a 52-calibre barrel is 30 km (19 mi) boat-tail or 39 km (24 mi) base bleed. |
| Sweden / France | 155 BONUS | 2000-current | A sensor fused submunition-carrying anti-tank projectile that consists of a carrier shell and two anti-armour submunitions. Maximum range is 27 km (17 mi) from a 39-calibre howitzer and 35 km (22 mi) from a 52-calibre gun. |
| Turkey | MOD 274 HE ER | 2018-current | A high-explosive extended range base bleed projectile developed for use with the Panter and the T-155 Fırtına 52-calibre howitzers, maximum range of 39 km (24 mi). |
| United Kingdom | BAE Systems ER HE | Development | An extended-range high-explosive (ER HE) projectile being developed to replace the L15 HE projectile. The projectile features a streamlined shape and a screw-on base bleed unit to increase range. Utilising the Silver Bullet Precision Guidance Kit it has a CEP of less than 20 m. Maximum range is stated as 30 and 40 km (19 and 25 mi) from 39 and 52-calibre howitzers respectively. |
| United Kingdom | L15 | 1986-current | General purpose HE projectile used by the United Kingdom. Maximum range of 24.9 km (15.5 mi) from a 39-calibre barrel and 30 km (19 mi) from a 52-calibre barrel. |
| United States | HVP | Development | The Hypervelocity Projectile (HVP) is an experimental hypervelocity projectile with ranges as great as 94 km (58 mi). |
| United States | LRLAP | 2010-2016 (limited) | The Long Range Land Attack Projectile (LRLAP) was an INS and GPS guided, rocket-assisted naval projectile with extended glide capability that was developed for use from the Advanced Gun System. Maximum range of 117 km (73 mi). Developed from 2000 and tested in the 2010s it was cancelled in 2016 due to excessive cost of projectiles. |
| United States | M102 | 1910s-1940s | HE projectile. Americanised version of the French Schneider 155 mm HE projectile for the Canon de 155 C modèle 1917 Schneider. |
| United States | M107 | 1940s-current | Standard HE projectile developed from the M102 for use in the 155 mm Howitzer M1. The projectile is one of the most widely used of all Western artillery projectiles and is fired from a variety of 155 mm towed and self-propelled howitzers. Largely replaced in US service by the M795. |
| United States | M483A1 DPICM | 1975-current | M483A1 Dual-Purpose Improved Conventional Munitions (DPICM) projectile is a dual-purpose anti-armour/anti-personnel projectile that consists of a carrier shell and 88 individual grenade submunitions. Introduced in 1975, it is used by a number of nations. From 2009 the US have been decommissioning their stockpile of rounds, reusing the bodies to make smoke, illumination and training projectiles. |
| United States | M549 HERA | 1970-current | The M549 and M549A1 high-explosive rocket assisted (HERA) shells are rocket-assisted projectiles designed to provide extended range over conventional shells. Maximum range of 30.1 km (18.7 mi) from a NATO-standard 39-calibre howitzer. The M549A1 is one of two projectiles for which the M1156 PGK fuze has been developed. |
| United States | M687 | 1987-1990 | A binary sarin chemical weapons projectile. Service ended after the 1990 Chemical Weapons Accord. |
| United States | M692/M731 ADAM | | The M692 and M731 Area Denial Artillery Munition (ADAM) are anti-personnel mine scattering projectiles. They share the carrier shell of the M483A1 DPICM and instead carry 36 anti-personnel mines. They are no longer produced or in service although it is assessed the US maintains stockpiles. |
| United States | M712 Copperhead | 1983-2010s | A laser-guided HEAT projectile. Developed in the 1970s and early 1980s, it saw service with the United States and several allies from the mid-1980s. Production ceased in 1990 and as of 2015 only residual stocks remain. Maximum range was 16 km (9.9 mi) from a 39-calibre howitzer. |
| United States | M718/M741 RAAMS | | The M718 and M741 Remote Anti-Armor Mine System (RAAMS) are anti-tank mine scattering projectiles. They share the carrier shell of the M483A1 DPICM and instead carry 9 anti-tank mines. They are no longer produced or in service although it is assessed the US maintains stockpiles. |
| United States | M795 | 1998-current | General purpose HE projectile developed with the intention of supplementing and eventually replacing the M107 in the US war stocks. Maximum range 24 km (15 mi) from a 39-calibre howitzer. The M795 is one of two projectiles for which the M1156 PGK fuze has been developed. |
| United States | M864 DPICM | 1987-current | A Dual-Purpose Improved Conventional Munition (DPICM) submunition-carrying projectile, it is regarded as a development of the M483A1 DPICM incorporating base bleed technology for increased range. It consists of a carrier shell and 72 individual grenade submunitions. Maximum range is 29.4 km (18.3 mi). |
| United States / Sweden | M982 Excalibur | 2014-current | An extended-range autonomously guided projectile using a combination of a high glide ratio lifting body airframe and GPS/IMU guidance. Maximum range is claimed to be 45 km (28 mi) from a 39-calibre howitzer and 50.6 km (31.4 mi) from a 52-calibre Archer. |
| United States | W48 | 1963-1992 | A tactical nuclear artillery projectile in service from 1963 to 1992. |
| United States | XM1113 HE RAP | Development | Rocket-assisted projectile being developed to replace the M549A1 HERA. Maximum range of 40 km (25 mi) when fired from a NATO-standard 39-calibre howitzer. Northrop Grumman have announced plans to develop an extended range upgrade for the M1156 PGK fuze which will be compatible with this projectile. |
| United States | XM1128 ER HE | Development | Extended range base bleed projectile being developed to replace the M795. Maximum range of 30 km (19 mi) when fired from a NATO-standard 39-calibre howitzer. Northrop Grumman have announced plans to develop an extended range upgrade for the M1156 PGK fuze which will be compatible with this projectile. |
| United States | XM1155-SC | Development | Extended range projectile under development by BAE Systems for the US Army, designed to engage fixed and moving targets at long range. |

== Twenty-first century production and usage rates ==
As of February 2023–March 2023, Ukraine was firing up to 10,000 artillery shells per day, with the average monthly rate of 90,000–110,000 of 155 mm shells. In March 2023, the Ukrainian defense minister asked allies for 250,000 of such shells per month.

Before the start of the large-scale Russian invasion of Ukraine (2022), the US produced 14,400 shells per month. As of March 2023, the rate has increased to 20,000 per month. The US declared its plans to increase the production to 90,000 per month, to reach 1,000,000 shells per year in 2025.

Germany's Rheinmetall was producing 60,000–70,000 per year in 2022. Rheinmetall said it was ready to boost production to 500,000 per year.

Ukraine has a domestic production of shells. As of December 2022, the production rate was "in the thousands".

In summer 2023, the EU approved a plan that provides for the production of 650,000 large-calibre ammunition per year, and pledged to supply one million artillery shells to Ukraine over the next 12 months.
