= Panter howitzer =

Turkish howitzer

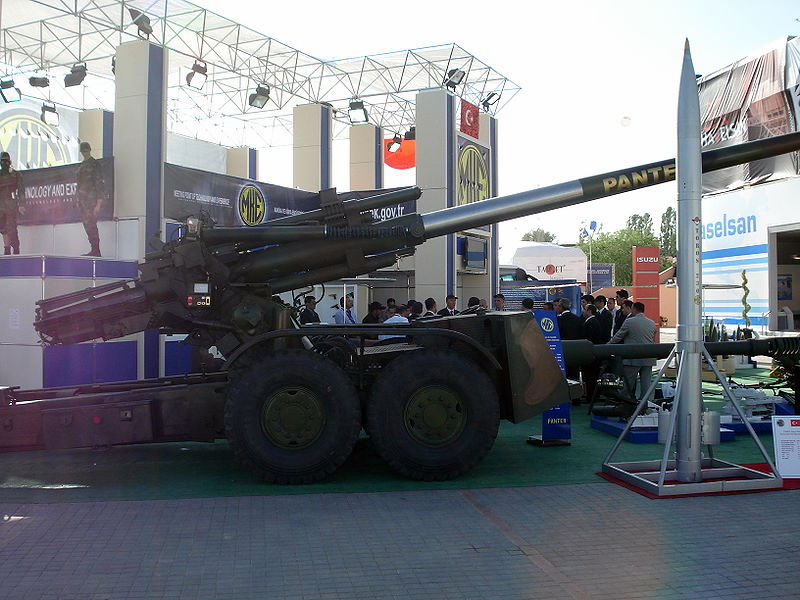
- Towed Panter howitzer on display at the IDEF 2009 Fair
- Type: Howitzer
- Place of origin: Turkey

Service history
- In service: 2002–
- Used by: Turkey

Production history
- Designer: MKEK
- Designed: 1990
- Manufacturer: MKEK
- Produced: 2000–
- No. built: 339+

Specifications
- Mass: 18,000 kg
- Length: 11.60 m (On road position)
- Crew: 6
- Shell: 155 mm NATO
- Caliber: 155 mm/52 caliber
- Breech: Semi-automatic Interrupted screw with electronic rammer
- Carriage: 6 wheeled split trail
- Elevation: −3 Degrees/+65 Degrees
- Traverse: 20° left or right from centerline
- Rate of fire: 6 rounds/min normal, 3 rounds in 15 sec impact, 2 rounds/min continuous
- Effective firing range: 18 km (M107), 30 km (M549 projectile(RAP)), 40 km (ERFB/Base bleed)
- Maximum firing range: 40 km (with ERFB/BB round)
- Feed system: hydraulically powered flick rammer assisted loading
- Engine: Deutz air-cooled diesel 160 hp
- Maximum speed: 20 km/h (On Asphalt Road), 80 km/h (Towed)

The Panter howitzer is an artillery weapon developed by MKEK for the Turkish Land Forces Command. It has a 155 mm/52-calibre towed howitzer gun and is able to fire NATO projectiles to a maximum range of 40 kilometers using extended-range ammunition. Mounted on the forward part of the carriage is an Auxiliary Power Unit (APU) that enables the Panter to propel itself at a maximum speed of 20 km/h on asphalt road.

== Development ==
The 155 mm/52 calibre Panter towed howitzer was developed in the 1990s to meet the operational requirements of the Turkish Land Forces Command (TLFC). Following trials and modifications with a number of prototype systems, the first production order was placed and the manufacturing of the first batch of six 155 mm/52 calibre Panter systems began in 2000; the systems were delivered in 2002. They were built at the Çankırı facilities of MKEK CANSAS, and handed over to the 105th Artillery Regiment in Çorlu with a ceremony held at the 1011th Ordnance factories in Ankara. The first production batch of 155 mm/52 calibre Panter consisted of 18 units, sufficient to equip one artillery regiment, which has three batteries each of six weapons.

While Turkey carried out extensive upgrades on old US-supplied M44 (155 mm) and M52 (105 mm) self-propelled weapons, which have been fitted with a 155 mm/39 calibre barrel, the 155 mm/52 calibre Panter is the first complete artillery system developed in Turkey. According to Janes Armour and Artillery 2007–2008 it is understood that some assistance during the development phase of the 155 mm/52 calibre Panter was provided by an overseas company. This is believed to be Singapore Technologies Kinetics, which also developed the FH-2000 155 mm/52-calibre towed artillery system to meet the requirements of the Singapore Armed Forces.

== Design ==
The 155 mm/52 calibre Panter howitzer is mounted on a conventional split-trail carriage. When in the travelling position the 155 mm/52 calibre ordnance is traversed through 180° and locked in position over the closed trails. The travel lock is mounted on the right trail. Mounted on the forward part of the carriage is an Auxiliary Power Unit (APU) that enables the 155 mm/52 calibre Panter to propel itself at a maximum speed of 18 km/h. When deployed in the firing position the weapon is supported on a circular baseplate mounted under the carriage and the two trails each of which is provided with a spade.

When deployed in the firing position, the four main roadwheels are raised clear of the ground. Each trail leg has a small wheel to assist in bringing the weapon into the firing position. These are also used in conjunction with the four main wheels when the weapon is being used in its self-propelled mode. The sighting system, as well as the laying equipment, is mounted on the left side, where the seat for the layer is provided.

The 155 mm/52 calibre Panter is used in conjunction with the locally developed Aselsan BAIKS-2000 Field Artillery Battery Fire Direction system.

== Users ==
- (Turkey) Turkish Army – as of 2012, around 255 acquired, total 400 planned.

== See also ==
- T-155 Fırtına
