= M1156 precision guidance kit =

U.S. Army smart munitions system

- Diagram of XM1156 alongside standard fuse profile
- Type: GPS-guided artillery fuze kit
- Place of origin: United States

Service history
- In service: 2015–present
- Used by: US Army; US Marine Corps; Australian Army; Canadian Army; Finnish Army

Production history
- Designer: Alliant Techsystems
- Designed: 2007–2013
- Manufacturer: Northrop Grumman Innovation Systems
- Unit cost: US $13,541 (Note: Price per unit in the 2013 fiscal year. That price was expected to fall as production increased.)
- Produced: 2013–present
- No. built: Over 100,000 (Note: According to Northrop Grumman, as of September 2022 over 100,000 PGKs had been produced and delivered.)

Specifications
- Mass: 3 lb (1.4 kg)
- Length: 8.67 in (220.2 mm) overall; 3.75 in (95.25 mm) visible; 4.91 in (124.7 mm) intrusion
- Detonation mechanism: Impact and proximity-detonation functions
- Guidance system: GPS
- Steering system: Four fixed canards
- Accuracy: CEP of less-than 30 m (98 ft) (Note: A majority of rounds attained a CEP of 10 m (33 ft) during the 2015 First Article Acceptance Test.)
- Launch platform: M549 HERA projectile; M795 HE projectile
- References: Janes

The M1156 precision guidance kit (PGK), formerly XM1156, is a U.S. Army-designed precision guidance system to turn existing 155 mm artillery shells into smart weapons. The prime contractor was Alliant Techsystems – later merging with Orbital Sciences Corporation to form Orbital ATK, in turn being taken over by Northrop Grumman and renamed Northrop Grumman Innovation Systems – and the industry team includes Interstate Electronics Corporation. By April 2018, more than 25,000 PGKs had been produced.

== Overview ==
Setting the fuze

In operation the PGK screws into the nose of the projectile much like conventional fuzes. In addition to the fuzing function, it provides a GPS guidance package and control surfaces to correct the flight of the shell. This is analogous to the addition of a Joint Direct Attack Munition (JDAM) tail-kit to a dumb iron bomb, creating a precision-guided munition. The system began production in 2009 and was first expected to be in service by 2010, but was ultimately fielded in spring 2013.

A conventional unguided M549A1 155 mm artillery projectile has a circular error probable (CEP) of 267 m (876 ft) at its maximum range, meaning that half of the rounds can be expected to land within 267 m (876 ft) of their intended target. This has made unguided artillery dangerous to use in close combat for fear of friendly fire and collateral damage. The M982 Excalibur was fielded as a guided shell that effectively hit within 6 m (20 ft) of a target, but the Army developed the XM1156 as a cheaper alternative. The PGK fuse can be screwed onto existing M549A1 and M795 projectiles, be fired from M109A6 Paladin and M777A2 Howitzer artillery systems, and hits within 50 m (160 ft) of the target at any range.

Small aerodynamic fins allow the system to steer the shell on target. Its GPS receiver compares the PGK's flight pattern to the coordinates of where it should hit, and the fins adjust its path to match where the round will actually impact. A failsafe exists where, if the shell does not impact within 150 m (490 ft) of the intended target, it will land but not explode; the PGK "decides" five seconds after launch whether it expects to impact close enough to detonate. This safety feature is expected to give soldiers more confidence when calling in artillery support close to their position. The PGK fuze weighs 3 lb (1.4 kg), 1 lb (0.45 kg) more than a standard fuze because of the addition of fins and an alternator. The self-contained system does not need a battery since the alternator inside generates power in flight. Not only is the PGK fuze cheaper to produce than whole purpose-built guided artillery shells, but its purpose to turn standard shells into more accurate rounds enables the millions of rounds already in inventories to be upgraded, while new smart shells have to be built to create a stockpile.

The PGK is compatible with various 155 mm artillery stockpiles to reduce dispersion. It was demonstrated on German DM111 shells in September 2014 fired from a PzH2000 self-propelled howitzer. From a distance of 27 km (17 mi), 90 percent of the PGK-equipped German shells landed within 5 meters of the target.

=== Program timeline ===
- June 2006: Raytheon removed from XM1156 competition.
- July 2006: BAE Systems and Alliant Techsystems selected to take part in a competitive Technical Development (TD) program.
- May 2007: System Demonstration and Development (SDD) contract awarded to Alliant Techsystems.
- October 2012: Soldiers from Fort Bliss became the first troops to fire the XM1156 guidance kit. 24 PGK-equipped projectiles were fired.

=== Trials ===
Following fielding in Afghanistan under an urgent materiel release, the PGK underwent First Article Acceptance Tests to verify performance, reliability, and safety. During tests, PGK-fuzed rounds had consistent performance across towed and self-propelled artillery platforms, passing the accuracy objective requirement of 30 m (98 ft) or less CEP with a majority of rounds being placed within 10 m (33 ft). On 6 February 2015, ATK announced that the PGK had passed acceptance testing and been approved for low-rate initial production (LRIP). In April 2015, the PGK completed a first Production Lot Acceptance Test to assess the reliability and provide acceptance of the first low rate initial production lot. 41 out of 42 PGK rounds fired from an M109A6 Paladin performed reliably, a 97 percent success rate.

On 29 June 2015, Orbital ATK announced that the PGK had completed its first production Lot Acceptance Test, demonstrating a median accuracy of less than 10 m (33 ft) and passing all safety and reliability requirements. Two additional Lot Acceptance Tests are to confirm production consistency and provide information for product improvements over the course of production. By mid-2016, 4,779 PGK fuses had been produced under the low-rate initial production contract, with full-rate production commencing through 2019.

=== Variants ===
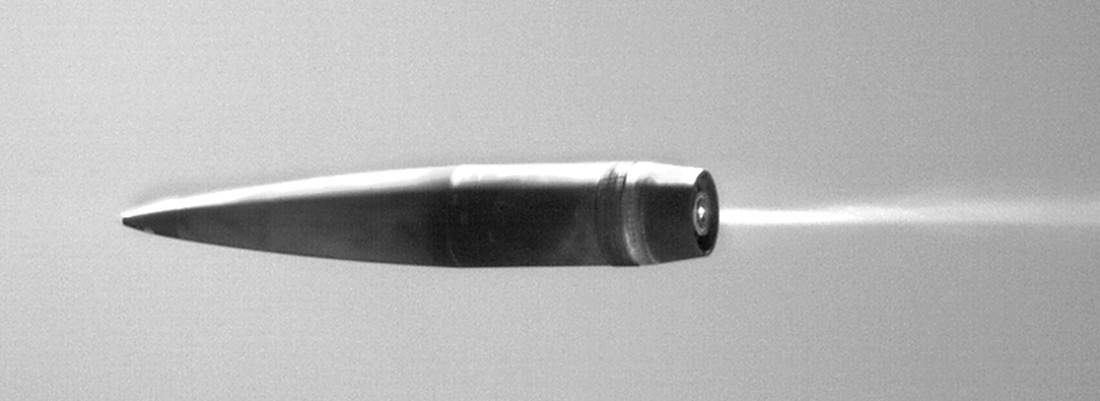
XM1113 extended range artillery round, shown here at a range demonstration, uses a rocket-assist motor

As of 2021, the U.S. Army plans to produce the upgraded M1156E2/A1, compatible with newer XM1128 high explosive and XM1113 rocket-assisted projectiles to achieve 10 m (33 ft) accuracy at 30 and 40 km (19 and 25 mi) respectively when fired from a 39-caliber barrel. The follow-on M1156E3/A2 in 2022 will be designed to operate with the GPS-M satellite constellation along with having a cheaper electronic module. After that, a new version known as the Long Range PGK will enable accuracy with XM1113 projectiles out to 70 km (43 mi) when fired from 58-caliber barrels of artillery pieces developed from the Extended Range Cannon Artillery (ERCA) program, as well as being compatible with legacy projectiles and being able to operate in a near-peer GPS threat environment. As of March 2024, the LR-PGK is expected to undergo its Critical Design Review in Q4 2025, followed by Full Materiel Release (FMR) qualification testing from Q1 2027 through Q3 2028, culminating in readiness to enter the Production and Deployment phase in Q3 2028.

=== Export ===
On 8 August 2013, Australia requested the sale of 4,002 M1156 Precision Guidance Kits with training and associated equipment for $54 million, something unusual for an item still in low-rate initial production. PGKs were ordered for Australia and Canada in February 2015. Australia is to begin receiving PGKs in the December 2015–January 2016 timeframe. On 24 April 2018, the US Defense Security Cooperation Agency approved the foreign military sale of 3,500 M1156 kits to the Netherlands at an estimated cost of US$70 million. In August 2024, Finland bought some 5,500 M1156A1 Precision Guidance Kits, valued at $70m.

== Deployment ==
In March 2013, the 15th Field Artillery Regiment in Afghanistan began training on equipment related to the XM1156, and began fielding PGK rounds shortly after, with initial fielding completed by the end of June. The U.S. Army received 2,400 PGK-equipped shells and the U.S. Marine Corps received 700 shells.

== Specifications ==
- Guidance: GPS
- Accuracy:
  - Increment I: < 50 m circular error probable (CEP)
  - Increment II: < 30 m CEP
- Unit cost: < $10,000
- Fusing options: Point detonating or proximity airburst

== See also ==
- M982 Excalibur – (United States, Sweden)
- XM395 precision guided mortar munition – (United States)
- Joint Direct Attack Munition – (United States)
