= M1128 projectile =

155 mm base bleed artillery round

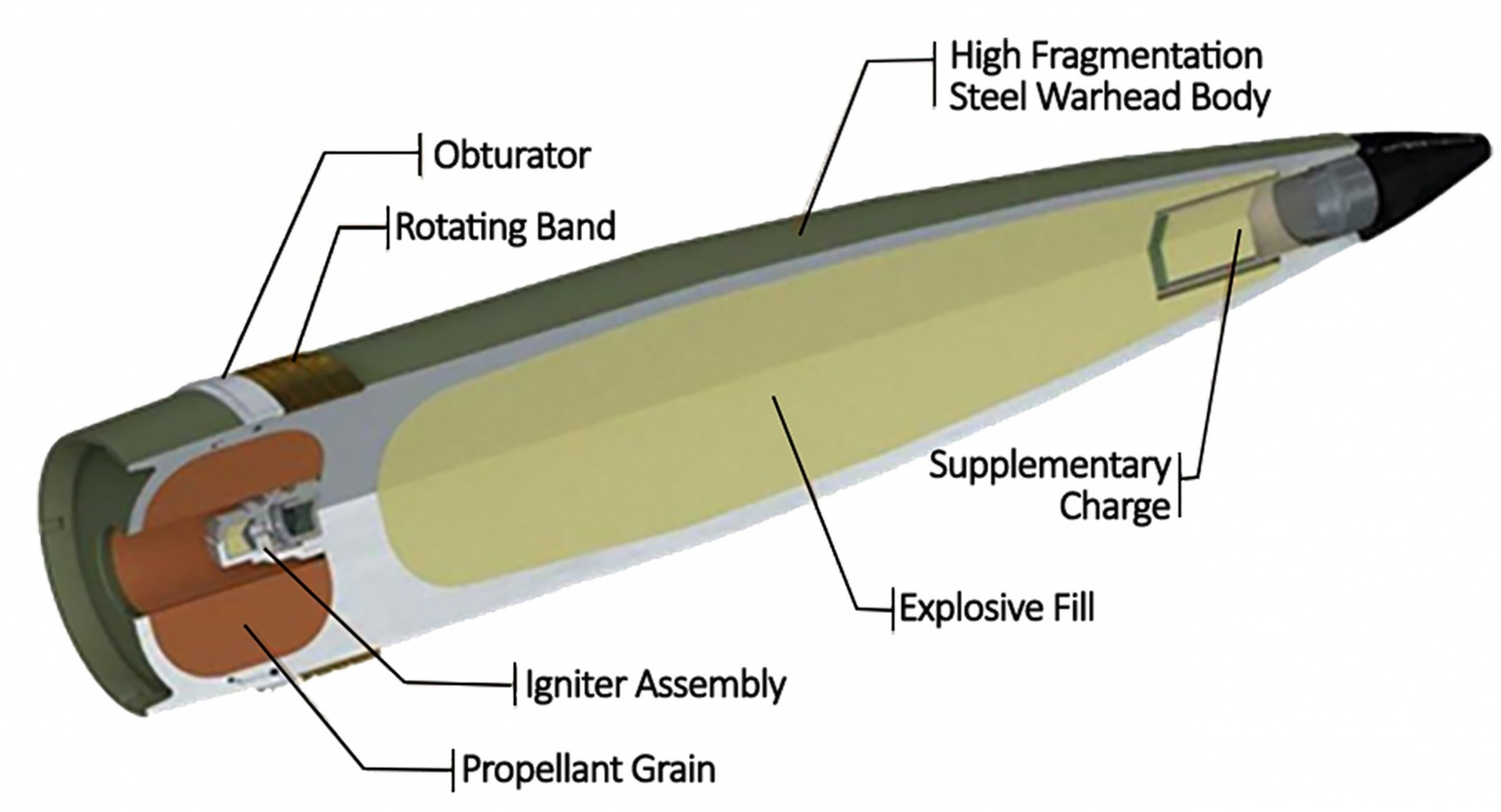
Cutaway view of M1128 round

The M1128 "Insensitive Munition High Explosive Base Burn Projectile" is a 155 mm boosted artillery round designed to achieve a maximum range of 30–40 kilometres (19–25 mi). It is used for fragmentation and blast effect against personnel and/or materiel. The development of this round follows testing of (and is based on aspects of) boosted M795-series test projectiles. The M1128 is not yet in production, but the first successful test firings have already taken place.

The M1128 is expected to be compatible with a nose-mounted guidance system—specifically, the XM1156 Precision Guidance Kit, which fits the standard fuse threading common to several types of rounds.

== Development ==
The design program for the M1128 was established in FY2011 with the stated purpose of addressing USMC requirements for artillery ammunition capable of 30–40 kilometres (19–25 mi) range. It is also designed for improved accuracy. It carries a larger payload than the aging M549 Extended Range Projectile or ERP, which is the previous boosted round the M1128 is designed to replace. The M1128's range of 30 kilometres (19 mi) far exceeds conventional (non-boosted) artillery rounds such as the M107 projectile which has a 17 kilometres (11 mi) range.

The Army is currently in the process of adopting the USMC requirement for the M1128. Once approved, the plan for the M1128 is to enter the Engineering & Manufacturing Development Phase in the acquisition process as a fully funded program. Tooling and processes have been developed and the initial production batch has been delivered to the proving grounds for testing by USMC resources.

== Details ==
The M1128 follows (and is based on) production and test articles from the boosted M795-series rounds—specifically the M795E1 and M795E2.

The M1128 consists of a high fragmentation steel body with a streamlined ogive and a drag-reducing base burner. The projectile body is filled with insensitive explosive (IMX-101) and a supplementary charge. On gun launch propellant gases enter the base burner cavity and ignite dual tracer cups in the ignition assembly. The tracer cups then light a composite propellant to sustain the burning at muzzle exit. The roughly three pound base propellant charge gases, ignited during firing, fill the low pressure void at the base of the projectile, this reduces the base drag and results in extended range.

The base-bleed solution yields a more consistent ballistic trajectory, which reduces the Range Probable Error or RPE. (See also Circular Error Probable.) The M1128 uses the "base burn" or "base bleed" assembly.

== Used with ==
- M109
- M114
- M198
- M777

== See also ==
- M549
- M795
- M107
- List of artillery
