= M795 projectile =

American 155 mm high explosive howitzer projectile

155 mm M795 HE projectile
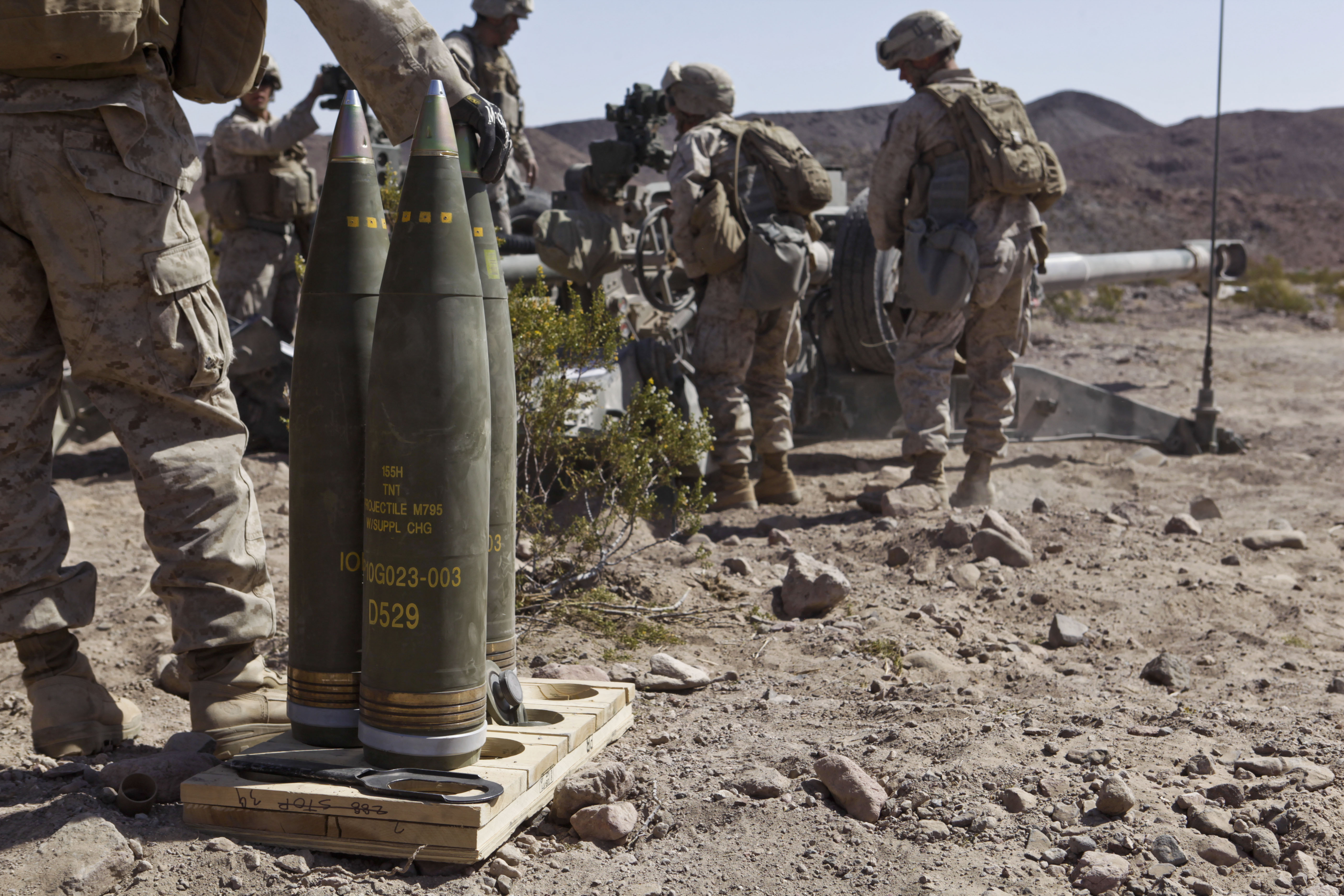
- Ready M795 rounds with fuzes fitted for a M777 howitzer
- Type: High Explosive artillery projectile
- Place of origin: United States

Service history
- In service: 1998–Present

Production history
- Designed: 1982–1995

Specifications
- Mass: 103 lb (47 kg)
- Length: 33.8 in (858 mm) fused
- Diameter: 155 mm (6.1 in)
- Muzzle velocity: 2,700 ft/s (830 m/s)
- Maximum firing range: 13.9 mi (22.4 km)
- Filling: TNT or IMX-101
- Filling weight: 24 lb (10.8 kg)
- References: Janes & GD‐OTS

M795E1 / M795E2 HE-BB projectile
- Type: High Explosive-Base Bleed artillery projectile
- Place of origin: United States

Production history
- Designed: 2001–2011

Specifications
- Mass: 103 lb (46.72 kg)
- Length: 33.8 in (858 mm) fused
- Diameter: 155 mm (6.1 in)
- Maximum firing range: 17.7 mi (28.5 km) (Note: The M795E1 achieved a range of 17.7 mi (28.5 km) when fired from a 39‐caliber barrel.)
- Filling: TNT (M795E1); IMX-101 (M795E2)
- Filling weight: 20.1 lb (9.12 kg)
- References: Janes

The M795 155 mm projectile is the US Army and US Marine Corps' standard 155 mm High Explosive (HE) projectile for howitzers. It is a bursting round with fragmentation and blast effects.

The M795 is designed to be more lethal and have a longer range than that of the M107. A welded band replaces the swaged rotating band of the M107, allowing the M795 to be fired with M119 or M203 propelling charges, increasing range by 6,000 metres (6.0 km; 3.7 mi). The explosive payload was improved, as was the fragmentation pattern, giving 30% higher lethality.

== Description ==
The M795 is a 155 mm high-fragmentation, steel (HF1)-body projectile, filled with 10.8 kilograms (23.8 lb) of TNT. It weighs approximately 47 kilograms (103 lb). The high-fragmentation steel body is encircled by a gilding metal rotating band, making it compatible with 3W through 8S (M3A1 through M203A1) zone propelling charges across all current 155 mm howitzers.

The projectile is packaged on a metal pallet, with a shock-attenuating lifting plug and flexible rotating band cover. The M795 projectile is ballistically similar to the M483A1 family of cargo projectiles and may be used as a registration round for the M483A1 family. The M795 projectile is more effective against personnel and materiel at greater ranges than the older M107 projectile.

== Service ==
As of April 2023, the Ukrainian military is firing an estimated 6,000–8,000 M795 projectiles daily at Russian targets. Two days of expenditures at this rate is roughly equivalent to one month's production of M795 rounds in the United States (at 2022 production levels).

== Course Correcting Fuze ==
In mid-2005, United Defense demonstrated a cost-effective system to improve cannon artillery accuracy with the successful firing of inert M795 155 mm projectiles equipped with a two-directional Course Correcting Fuze (CCF). United Defense developed this new system together with Bofors Defence, Rockwell Collins and BT Fuze Products.

Course correction uses GPS to provide high accuracy. It can be employed on all types of U.S. 155 mm and 105 mm projectiles in the U.S. Field Artillery inventory.

United Defense successfully fired M795 rounds equipped with the CCF from an M109A6 Paladin, to ranges of 14.5 km (9.0 mi) at Yuma Proving Ground. Preliminary analysis from the demonstration confirmed United Defense's laboratory analysis. The projectiles equipped with the CCF achieved a precision error of less than 50 m (160 ft), three times better than the control rounds.

== M795E1 ==
Talley Defense Systems, Inc., has been selected for the development and fabrication of the upgraded M795E1 Propellant Grain and Igniter components. As the Army's M864 Base Burner Assembly development and production source, Talley delivered nearly one million production base burner assemblies.

An extended-range version of the M795 projectile is desirable. When fired from the M198 155 mm towed howitzer (39 caliber tube) with the M203A1 propelling charge, the maximum range would be between 26.5 km (16.5 mi) (threshold) and 28.55 km (17.74 mi) (objective). The maximum range when fired from a Crusader type system (52 caliber tube) would be 34 km (21 mi) (threshold) to 36 km (22 mi) (objective). Extending the range of the M795 HE projectile provides the ability to engage even greater distances, and provides for a munition which is compatible with current and developmental delivery systems and their associated propellants.

The US Army has identified a need to provide extended-range 155 mm HE projectiles for both current and future artillery systems. Leveraging advanced ballistic design technology from two key stockpile projectiles, the 155 mm M795E1 Extended Range HE Base Burner Projectile will extend the maximum range capability for the delivery of an enhanced HE payload.

Using the production M795 HE Projectile as a baseline, designers began optimizing ballistic configurations and incorporating an improved drag reduction system, based on the successful 155 mm M864 Extended Range Dual-Purpose Improved Conventional Munition (DPICM) Base Burner Projectile. Designated the M795E1, this projectile will provide a significantly larger HE, high fragmentation warhead, and improved lethality over the aging M549A1 HE Rocket Assisted Projectile, and will maintain an extended range capability to counter the longer range artillery threat of potential adversaries.

Although the current M795 offers extended range over the old M107 (17.5 to 22.5 km (10.9 to 14.0 mi)), it falls short of the Army's other extended-range projectiles (28 to 30 km (17 to 19 mi) range). The currently approved M795 Operational Requirement Document (ORD) establishes the need for an extended-range version of the M795 to support anticipated warfighting scenarios.

== Specifications ==
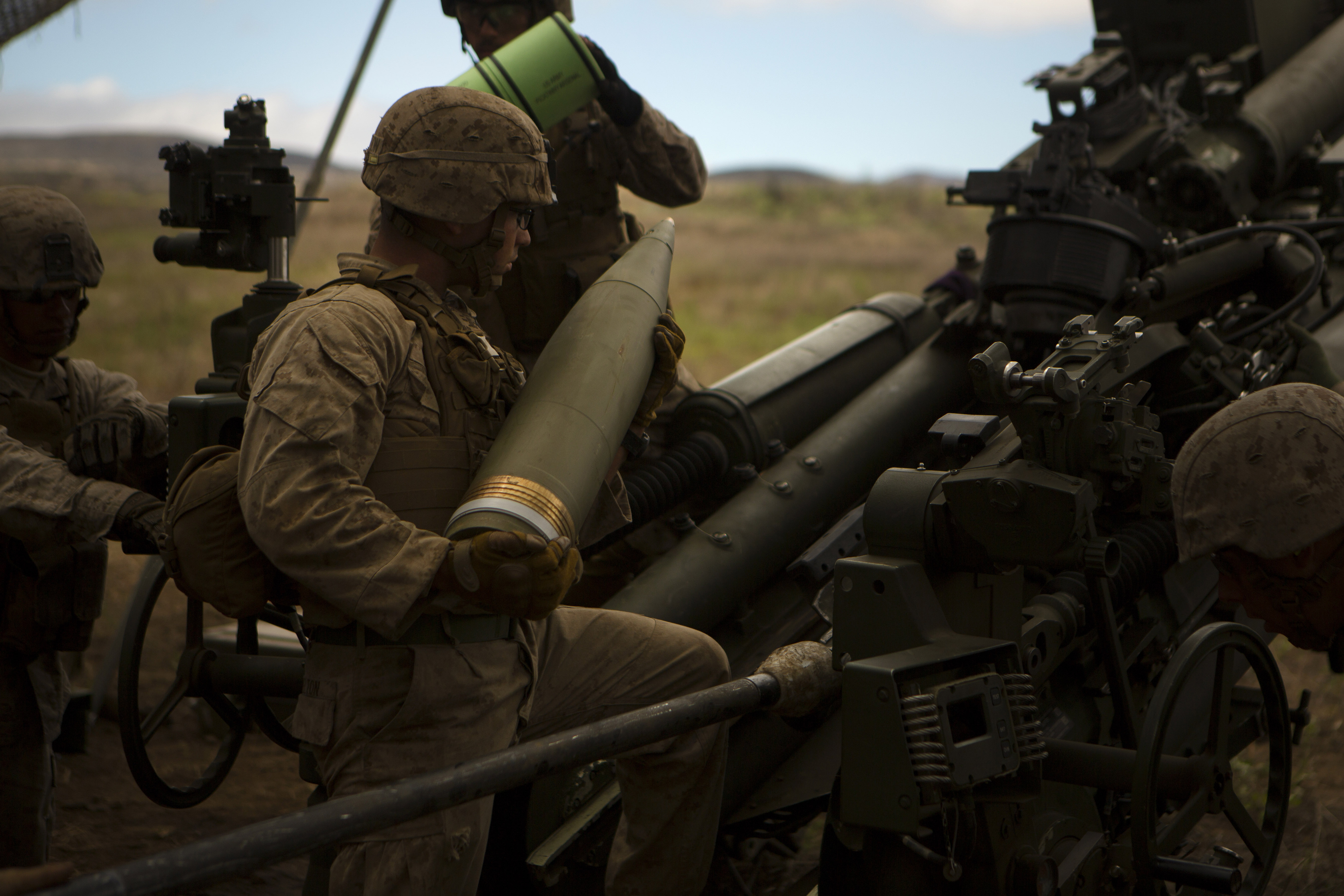
A US Marine loading an M795 projectile in 2014

=== M795 ===
- Range: 22.5 km (14.0 mi) with 39 caliber barrel
- CEP: 139 m (456 ft) at maximum range with 39-caliber barrel
- Weight as fired: 46.7 kg (103 lb)
- Explosive content:
  - TNT: 10.8 kg (23.8 lb) with a charge liner OR IMX-101 (IMX was adopted by the Army; Marines still use TNT)
- Length with fuze: 840 mm (33.2 in)
- Body diameter: 154.89 mm (6.098 in)
- Manufacturer: General Dynamics (formerly Chamberlain Manufacturing Corporation), Scranton Division, Scranton Army Ammunition Plant, Scranton, Pennsylvania; Day & Zimmerman, Parsons, Kansas; Mason & Hanger - Silas Mason Company

=== M795E1 ===
- Range: 28.7 to 37 km (17.8 to 23.0 mi)

== See also ==
- List of crew served weapons of the US Armed Forces
- M549 – (United States)
- M982 Excalibur – (United States, Sweden)
