= Traveling charge =

Additional explosive charge

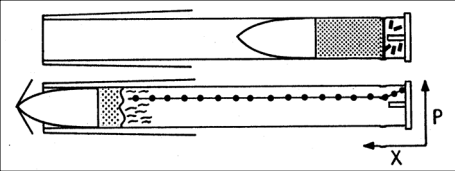
Schematic of traveling charge propulsion concept

A traveling charge is an additional explosive charge attached to the bottom of the projectile so that it travels with the projectile inside the gun barrel while burning. The concept was proposed by H. Langweiler in 1939.

== See also ==
- Base bleed
- Caseless ammunition
- Gyrojet
- Rocket-assisted projectile
