= M982 Excalibur =

155 mm guided artillery shell

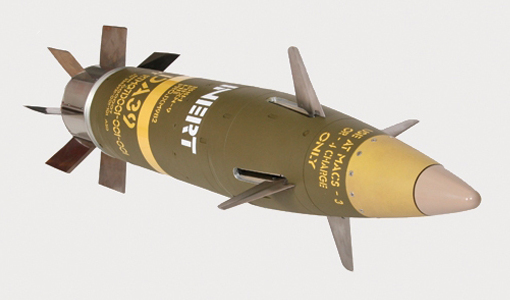
- Type: Guided artillery shell
- Place of origin: Sweden, United States

Service history
- Used by: See operators

Production history
- Manufacturer: BAE Systems AB: Bofors; Raytheon Missiles & Defense
- Unit cost: US$112.8k (FY2021 President's Budget Request)

Specifications
- Mass: 48 kg (106 lb)
- Length: 100 cm (39.2 in)
- Diameter: 155 mm (6.1 in)
- Caliber: 155 mm
- Maximum firing range: Increment Ia-1: 23 km (14 mi); Increment Ia-2/Ib: 40 km (25 mi) (39 cal); 50 km (31 mi) (52 cal); 70 km (43 mi) (58 cal)
- Warhead: PBXN-9
- Warhead weight: 5.4 kg (12 lb)
- Guidance system: GPS, inertial navigation
- Accuracy: M892: < 20 m (66 ft) CEP; M892A1: 4 m (13 ft) CEP, or < 1 m (3 ft) CEP (K9 at 50 km (31 mi) range)

The M982 Excalibur (previously XM982) is a 155 mm (6.1 in) extended-range guided artillery shell developed in a collaborative effort between the US Army Research Laboratory (ARL) and the United States Army Armament Research, Development and Engineering Center (ARDEC). The Excalibur was developed and manufactured by prime contractor Raytheon Missiles & Defense, BAE Systems AB (BAE Systems Bofors) and other subs and primes in multiple capacities such as Camber Corporation and Huntington Ingalls Industries. It is a GPS and inertial-guided munition capable of being used in close support situations within 75–150 meters (250–490 ft) of friendly troops or in situations where targets might be prohibitively close to civilians to attack with conventional unguided artillery fire. In 2015, the United States planned to procure 7,474 rounds with a FY 2015 total program cost of US$1.9341 billion at an average cost of US$258,777 per unit. By 2016, unit costs were reduced to US$68,000 per round. Versions that add laser-guidance capability and are designed to be fired from naval guns began testing in 2015. By October 2018, over 1,400 rounds had been fired in combat.

== Description ==
Excalibur, named after the mythical sword of King Arthur, was developed as a longer-range alternative to conventional artillery shells, with GPS guidance for improved accuracy. Excalibur has a range of approximately 40 to 57 kilometers (25 to 35 mi) depending on configuration, with a circular error probable (CEP) of 4 meters (13 ft), while unguided Western artillery shells can land up to 150 meters (490 ft) from the target at a range of 24 km (15 mi). While much more expensive at $68,000 per shell compared to an $800 unguided M777 shell, it is less expensive than the $150,000 rocket used in US guided-missile systems like M142 HIMARS and M270 Multiple Launch Rocket System. Excalibur's extended range is achieved through the use of folding glide fins, which allow the projectile to glide from the top of a ballistic arc toward the target. A lower cost alternative to the Excalibur is to use the US Army designed M1156 precision guidance kit to turn existing 155 mm shells into precision weapons.

The munition was co-developed by United States-based Raytheon Missiles & Defense (guidance system) and the Swedish BAE Systems Bofors (body, base, ballistics, and payload). Excalibur is used to minimize collateral damage, for targets beyond the range of standard munitions, for precise firing within 150 meters (490 ft) of friendly troops, or when terrain prevents direct fire. It has a multi-function fuze that can be programmed to explode in the air, once it hits a hard surface, or after it penetrates a target. One Excalibur projectile can accurately hit an intended target that would require the use of between 10 and 50 unguided artillery rounds.

Initial combat experience with Excalibur in Iraq in the summer of 2007 was highly successful, with 92% of rounds falling within 4 meters (13 ft) of their targets. Its performance was so impressive that the US Army planned to increase production to 150 rounds per month from the previous 18 rounds per month. In 2012, Excalibur rounds reached new record ranges in combat of 36 km (22 mi). In December 2020, the round was successfully tested out to a range of 70 km (43.5 mi) using a supercharged propellant out of a 58-caliber-long Extended Range Cannon Artillery (ERCA) gun tube.

Self-propelled guns compatible with the Excalibur projectile are the American M109A6 Paladin and M109A7, British AS-90, German PzH 2000, South African G6, Swedish Archer and French Caesar. Towed guns compatible with the Excalibur projectile are the American M198 and M777 howitzers, as well as the Indian ATAGS and Dhanush. According to media, Excalibur ammunition was also used with AHS Krab in 2022 in combat in Ukraine, obtaining range above 40 km (25 mi).

The US Navy had considered using the Excalibur in the Zumwalt-class destroyer's Advanced Gun System following the cancelation of the Long Range Land Attack Projectile, but the plan was later abandoned.

The Excalibur has been shown to be vulnerable to GPS jamming. When shells were first supplied to Ukraine during the Russian invasion of Ukraine, they initially hit targets with a 70% efficiency rate. However, within six weeks the Russians had adapted their electronic warfare systems and reduced its efficiency to only 6%.

=== Variants ===
There are three versions of the system. Initial development effort was toward Increment I; Milestone C decisions were to be made on Increment II and III in FY2013, with a demonstration of those capabilities by 2020.

- Increment I has a unitary penetrating warhead for use against stationary targets.
  - Increment Ia-1: Accelerated development, reduced-range round. Entered service in 2007. (XM982)
  - Increment Ia-2: Extended-range round with resistance to GPS jamming. (M982)
  - Increment Ib: Full-capability, reduced-cost, mass-production round. (M982A1)
    - Excalibur S: In June 2013, Raytheon initiated an internally funded program to upgrade the Excalibur Ib with additional semi-active laser targeting capability. The SAL seeker allows the shell to attack targets that have re-positioned after firing or are moving, and to change the impact point to avoid collateral damage.
    - Excalibur N5: Version of the Excalibur S downsized into a 127 mm (5.0 in) shell to give naval guns mounted on destroyers and cruisers the ability to fire extended-range guided projectiles. Raytheon was also considering a millimeter wave seeker for fire-and-forget operations.
    - Excalibur HTK: Excalibur HTK has an armor-penetrating warhead and leverages the proven StormBreaker smart weapon design. It autonomously locates a target with an all-weather seeker that is effective against moving and imprecisely located targets.
    - Excalibur EST: Excalibur Shaped Trajectory, allows the shell to make its final approach at an angle; demonstrated in August 2018 and deployed shortly thereafter.
- Increment II "Smart" projectile for moving and time-sensitive targets. May carry either 65 DPICM or two SADARM submunitions.
- Increment III "Discriminating" projectile "to search, detect, and selectively engage individual vehicles by distinguishing specific target characteristics".

== History ==
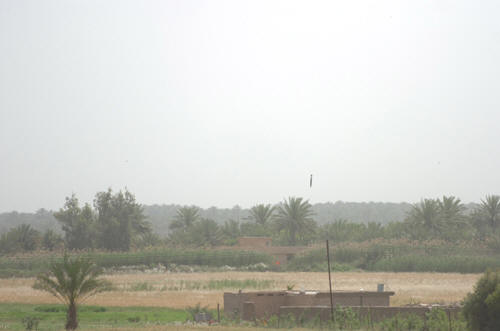
The first operational use of M982 Excalibur, against a suspected insurgent safe house north of Baghdad on 5 May 2007

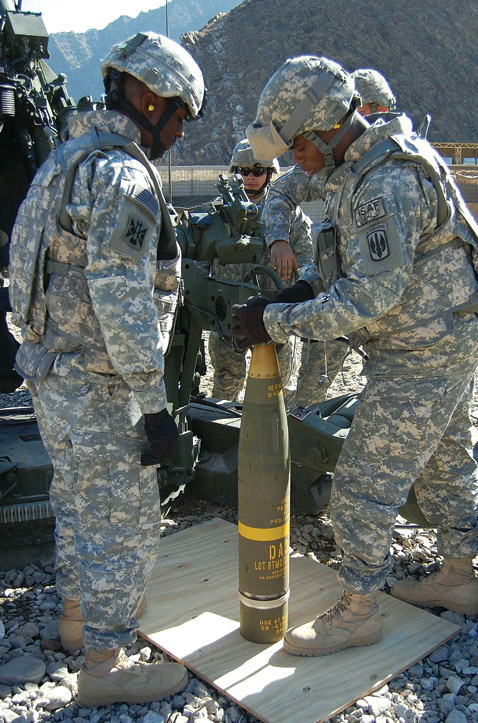
US Army artillerymen preparing an M982 Excalibur round for firing in Afghanistan, 2008

Excalibur started as a development program in 1992. The Operational Requirements Document (ORD) of May 1997 called for 200,000 rounds of an unguided munition with increased range at an estimated cost of $4,000/round, and Texas Instruments was awarded the initial EMD contract on 23 January 1998. In November 2001 the volume was cut to 76,677 rounds and soon after this was further reduced to 61,483, but the developers were encouraged by the Indian experience of using Russian Krasnopol guided shells against Pakistani bunkers in the Kargil War of 1999.

In March 2004 the program was merged with a Swedish/US program to create Trajectory Correctable Munitions, reflected in a new ORD in September 2004 which removed the Dual-Purpose Improved Conventional Munition "cluster bomb" variant in favor of the discriminating munition variant. Later that year the US Army reduced its planned order to 30,000 rounds. Low-rate production of 500 rounds was approved in May 2005 and Raytheon was awarded a contract to produce 165 rounds in June 2005, worth $22.1 million. In September of that year, the round was successfully demonstrated at Yuma Proving Ground, Arizona. Raytheon was awarded a $42.7 million contract for production of 335 Excalibur projectiles and related test articles and services in June 2006 for that fiscal year.

In August 2006, technical problems relating to environmental sensitivity and GPS signal lock were discovered, pushing the expected in-service date to spring 2007. Testing in September demonstrated an actual average CEP of 5 m (20 ft) or better.

Increment Ia-1 completed testing in early 2007 and in April that year the US Army approved an Urgent Material Release to allow deployment to Iraq. The Excalibur was first operationally fired in Iraq in May 2007. Increment Ia-2 achieved a 40 km (25 mi) range in a live-fire demonstration in April 2007 and in July the Army Acquisition Executive approved the Milestone C decision for Ia-2 to enter low-rate production. The munition was developed with US$55.1 million in financial assistance from Sweden, which expected to receive service rounds in 2010. The Excalibur debuted in Afghanistan in February 2008. The Australian Army ordered US$40 million of Excalibur rounds in October 2007, an order revised in April 2008 to an estimated US$58 million. In 2008 unit cost was US$85,000.

In September 2008 both Raytheon and Alliant Techsystems were awarded competitive development contracts for Increment Ib mass production, but Raytheon secured the final manufacturing contract in August 2010. Test firings of Increment Ia-1 rounds in March 2009 revealed that the Honeywell inertial measurement unit was not up to standard, and it was replaced by a unit from Atlantic Inertial Systems. In April 2010 the US Army's planned order was cut further, from 30,000 rounds to 6,264, which increased the unit cost sufficiently that it triggered an investigation under the Nunn–McCurdy Amendment. Normally a Nunn-McCurdy breach signals a program in trouble, but a 2012 RAND report concluded that the unit cost increases were caused by the cuts in procurement numbers: fewer shells were needed for the same effect, due to the improved accuracy of modern artillery.

The Excalibur gives US brigade commanders a precision weapon that is locally available, regardless of weather conditions (unlike bombs dropped from aircraft). Because the M982 is so accurate, the risks of friendly-fire casualties and collateral damage are no longer deterrents to using gun artillery in urban environments, and the Excalibur is sometimes called in only 50 m (160 ft) away from friendly infantrymen. In February 2012, a US Marine Corps M777 howitzer in Helmand province, Afghanistan, fired a single Excalibur round that killed a group of insurgents at a Marine-record range of 36 kilometers (22 mi).

In December 2012, Raytheon received a $56.6 million contract for low-rate initial production of Excalibur Ib projectiles. On 10 September 2013, Raytheon received a $54 million contract for a second lot of Excalibur Ib artillery rounds. The Excalibur Ib has improved reliability and lower unit cost than the previous Excalibur Ia-1 and Ia-2. At the time of the award, over 690 Excalibur projectiles had been fired in theater. In February 2014, the US Army and Raytheon fired 30 Excalibur Ib shells at test targets to confirm the performance and reliability of the configuration before full-rate production. Projectiles were fired from Paladin and M777 howitzers at ranges from 7 to 38 km (4.3 to 24 mi), each hitting within an average of 1.6 m (5 ft 3 in) from the target.

On 3 April 2014, the last Excalibur Ia projectile was assembled, signaling the transition to Increment Ib focus. Over 6,500 Ia shells were delivered to the US Army and Marine Corps as well as several international customers. Initial Operational Test and Evaluation (IOT&E) for the Excalibur Ib was completed in May 2014, moving the projectile closer to full-rate production. Testing of the Excalibur Ib averaged a miss distance of less than 2 m (6.6 ft). On 31 July 2014, Raytheon received a $52 million contract to begin full-rate production of the Excalibur Ib shell.

In June 2014, Raytheon successfully test-fired its Excalibur S shell with a dual-mode GPS/SAL guidance system. The variant incorporates a laser spot tracker (LST) into the Excalibur Ib shell. The test was to validate the LST's ability to survive being fired from a howitzer and was initialized with GPS coordinates, then a laser designator guided the round to the target. In February 2020, Raytheon announced the Excalibur S had been successfully tested against a moving target using its laser seeker.

In December 2019, the Indian Army conducted firing trials of Excalibur guided shells in the Pokhran Field Firing Range from one of its M777 howitzer. India procured 600 units of the type in October the same year (500 with 20 m (66 ft) CEP and 100 with 2 m (6.6 ft) CEP). India will use this ammunition from all 155 mm caliber guns including M777, Haubits FH77, Dhanush and K9 Vajra-T.

In April 2024, Hanwha Aerospace conducted test fires of the M982A1 Excalibur Increment Ib at Yuma Proving Ground using Norwegian K9 VIDAR variant. The K9 used various fuze modes and achieved less than one meter CEP in Point Detonating mode and 5 m (16 ft) above the target in Height of Burst mode from 50 km (31 mi) away.

As per reports in July 2025, the Indian Army is expected to urgently procure additional Excalibur shells following its extensive use during Operation Sindoor. As reported on 20 November, the Defense Security Cooperation Agency (DSCA) approved the supply of 216 Excalibur artillery shells at a cost of $47 million. Simultaneously, the supply of Javelin missile systems including 100 missiles and 25 launcher control units at a cost of $46 million.

=== Excalibur N5 ===
In September 2015, Raytheon conducted a live fire guided test flight of the Excalibur N5, a company-funded initiative to reduce the 155 mm (6.1 in) Excalibur shell to 127 mm (5.0 in) for use with naval guns mounted on destroyers and cruisers. The Excalibur Ib and N5 have 70% commonality, 99% identical software, and the same guidance and navigation unit (GNU). Its primary uses would be to allow warships to accurately fire shells against land targets in support of troops ashore and inexpensively destroy fast attack craft (FAC) at longer ranges.

Unguided 127 mm (5.0 in) shells from Mark 45 naval guns have a range of 24 km (15 mi), but can deliver accurate fire only out to 15 km (9.2 mi), while small cruise missile-carrying attack boats can launch from 28–37 km (17–23 mi) away. Like the land-based version, the Excalibur N5's guidance fins pop out after launch to glide the round out to longer ranges before turning nose-down and diving to the target, extending range to 37–48 km (23–30 mi) depending on gun barrel length; although range would be greater with rocket assistance, cost would also be greater. Alternative seekers will be added to hit maneuvering targets, such as laser guidance that requires a spotter to designate it, and millimeter wave radar that needs no outside guidance.

== Operators ==
=== Current operators ===
- Australia
- Canada – Canadian Army
- Jordan
- India
- Netherlands – Royal Netherlands Army: First ordered in 2015, qualified to enter service in October 2018.
- Spain
- Sweden
- Ukraine: Excalibur munitions were donated to the armed forces of Ukraine for use in M777 howitzers and AHS Krab following the Russian invasion of Ukraine.
- United States – US Army and US Marine Corps

=== Future or pending operators ===
- Norway – pending United States Department of Defense's foreign military sales request.
- Denmark

== See also ==
- Iron Sting – (Israel)
- M712 Copperhead – (United States)
- M1156 precision guidance kit – (United States)
- XM395 precision guided mortar munition – (United States)
- Krasnopol – (Russia, Soviet Union)
- Bofors/Nexter Bonus – (Sweden, France)
- Bofors STRIX – (Sweden)

== Bibliography ==
- Jane's Ammunition Handbook 2003–2004
