= Dual-purpose improved conventional munition =

Artillery warhead

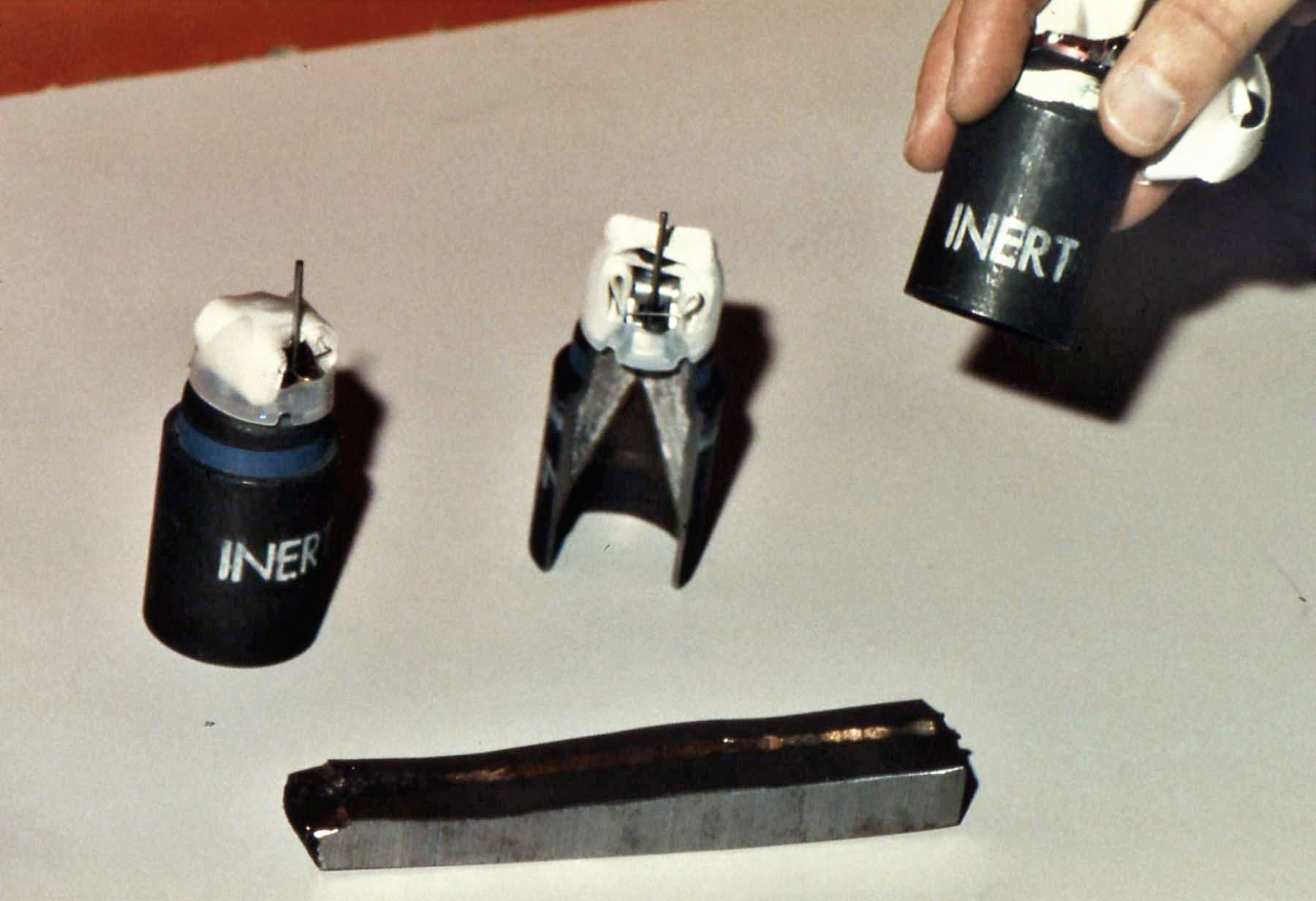
A US-made M77 DPICM of the type used by the MLRS artillery rocket launcher system. The M77 was developed from the M483A1 that was developed for so-called "cargo" artillery shells in the 155 mm and 8-inch (203 mm) calibers.

A dual-purpose improved conventional munition (DPICM) is an artillery or surface-to-surface missile warhead designed to burst into submunitions at an optimum altitude and distance from the desired target for dense area coverage. The submunitions use both shaped charges for the anti-armor role, and fragmentation for the antipersonnel role, hence the nomenclature "dual-purpose". Some submunitions may be designed for delayed reaction or mobility denial (mines). The air-to-surface variety of this kind of munition is better known as a cluster bomb. They are banned by more than 100 countries under the Convention on Cluster Munitions.

== United States DPICM projectiles ==
Combat comparative effectiveness (Vietnam)
| Conventional | 105 mm | 155 mm | 203 mm |
|---|---|---|---|
| Rounds expended | 7079 | 3465 | 149 |
| Rounds / kill | 31.6 | 13.6 | 16.6 |
| ICM | 105 mm | 155 mm | 203 mm |
| Rounds expended | 1121 | 772 | 153 |
| Rounds / kill | 2 | 1.7 | 0.8 |

Development work for DPICM projectiles began in the late 1950s. The first projectile, the 105 mm M444, entered service in 1961. Its submunitions were simple bounding anti-personnel grenades (ICM). Production of the M444 ended in the early 1990s.

The first true DPICM was the 155 mm M483, produced in the 1970s. By 1975, an improved version, the M483A1, was being used. The projectile carried 88 M42/M46 grenade-like dual purpose submunitions. The grenades are very similar, but M42 side wall is optimized for fragmentation characteristics while M46s have thicker walls strengthened to withstand additional setback loads in the last three aft layers of the projectile, where they are placed.

The 155 mm M864 projectile entered production in 1987, and featured a base bleed that enhances the range of the projectile, although it still carries the same M42/M46 grenades. The base bleed mechanism reduces the submunition count to 72. Work was budgeted in 2003 to retrofit the M42/M46 grenades with self-destruct fuses to reduce the problem of "dud" submunitions that do not initially explode, but may explode later upon handling.

Work on 105 mm projectiles started in the late 1990s based around the M80 submunition. The eventual results were two shells, the M915 intended for use with the M119A1 light towed howitzer, and the M916 developed for the M101/M102 howitzers.

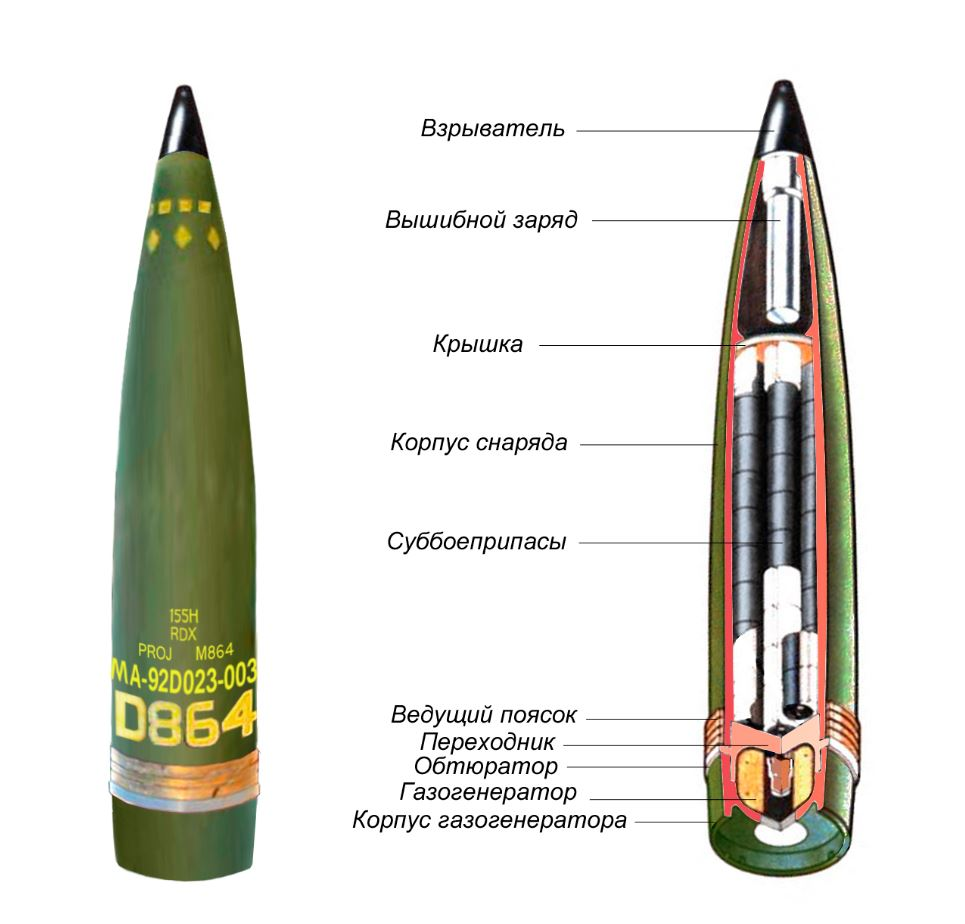
M864 showing arrangement of submunitions

| Projectile | M509A1 | M483A1 | M864 | M915 | M916 | M444 |
| Caliber mm | 203 | 155 | 155 | 105 | 105 | 105 |
| Service date | ? | 1975 | 1987 | 1998 (?) | 1998 | 1961 (production ended early 1990s) |
| Range km | 5.4–23.4 | ?–17 | ?–30 | 10–14 | 3–11 | ?–11.5 |
| Load | 180 × M42 | 64 × M42; 24 × M46 | 48 × M42; 24 × M46 | 42 × M80 | 42 × M80 | 18 × M39 (M444E1 used M36) |
| Weight projectile (fuzed) kg | 94 (approx) | 46.5 | 47 (approx) | ? | ? | 14.97 |
| Length (fuzed) mm | 1115 | 937 | 899 | ? | ? | 371.9 |

== Uses ==
DPICMs were developed for several reasons:

- They can give a heavy, indirect-fire cannon the ability to engage area targets, with the spread compensating for their inherent inaccuracy;
- DPICM has a potential destructive effect on armored vehicles due to the shaped charge bomblet, but it may require a very large number of shells to have an effect against targets like tank formations to the point of futility;

== Future ==
Large quantities of munitions bought during the Cold War were put into war reserve stockpiles. By the mid-2010s, many were reaching the end of their useful life and required disposal, an expensive process. The submunitions, which became old and less reliable, had to be extracted. After a careful "soft touch" disassembly fully intact D563 shell casings from M483-series 155-mm projectiles were being refilled with explosives, recycling them for use as inexpensive training ammunition. One such round is the M1122, built from recycled D563s mostly filled with concrete topped with some explosive filling. As a training round, the M1122 has one-seventh the explosive impact at one-third the cost of a standard M795 high-explosive shell.

The U.S. Army is seeking a replacement of DPICMs from the Alternative Warhead Program (AWP). The AWP warheads have an equal or greater effect against materiel and personnel targets, while leaving no unexploded ordnance behind. The program is being developed by Lockheed Martin and Alliant Techsystems. The first AW rockets were ordered in September 2015.

== Russian invasion of Ukraine ==
On July 7, 2023, the US announced that it would supply DPICM munitions to Ukraine. The weapon system could be used in both HIMARS and 155 mm shell projectiles.

President Biden justified the move by saying "the Ukrainians are running out of ammunition”. Colin H. Kahl, Under Secretary of Defense for Policy, told reporters that DPICMs were needed by Ukraine. Russian defences are making Ukraine’s offensive “hard sledding, because the Russians had six months to dig in.” Their usage also takes pressure off of US stockpiles of unitary high explosive rounds, such as those by HIMARS and the M982 Excalibur, allowing domestic production of these rounds to catch up to demand. Kahl also claimed that DPICMs can “scatter over a wide[r] area” than standard rounds, including Russian defences such as trenches. An unnamed Pentagon official put the figure of these rounds at “hundreds of thousands”. The expected fail rate is less than 2.35%. Kahl claimed that Russian cluster munitions have a fail rate of 30-40%. Ukraine has had to enter into guarantees not to use them in civilian areas and to mark areas where they have been used.

On 10 July, Royal United Services Institute (RUSI) published an article supporting the supply of cluster munitions to Ukraine, arguing that a United States Army study of the Vietnam War had found that while it took approximately 13.6 high explosive shells for each enemy soldier killed, a shell firing DPICMs relied on average only 1.7 shells to kill an enemy soldier, making it eight times as effective in producing casualties as standard high explosive projectiles. RUSI used an example of a trench, a direct hit by a high explosive round will spread shrapnel "within line of sight of the point of detonation". This also reduces the wear and tear on the barrels of 155 mm artillery weapons systems.

On July 12, Ukrainian Army Brigadier General Oleksandr Tarnavskyi, the commander of the Ukrainian Tavriia military sector deployed in the southern front, told CNN that they had received the cluster munitions pledged by the United States on July 7, 2023.

During the course of the Russo-Ukrainian War, objections have been raised by some NATO members which had signed the 2008 Convention on Cluster Munitions, including Germany, France and the United Kingdom. However neither Ukraine nor the United States have signed the agreement. Several other NATO member states, including Estonia, Finland, Greece, Latvia, Poland, Romania, and Turkey, are also not signatories of this agreement, nor is Russia. Human Rights Watch has reported that at least 10 types of cluster munitions are already being used on the battlefield, including munitions which were left over from USSR weapons stockpiles, and including the use of cluster munitions by Russia since 2014. It is reported, though officially denied, that Turkey has provided other types of cluster munitions to Ukraine in the past.

On 14 August, Ukrainian forces released drone footage from Urozhaine, in Donetsk Oblast. The two videos appear to show the remaining Russian forces in the town retreating under fire, as the Ukrainians deploy DPICMs in their path. Forbes writer David Axe has described the resulting scene as "murder" and a "bloodbath", given that Ukrainian artillery spotters were afforded an unobstructed view of the Russian retreat in the clear light of day, and the retreating Russian infantrymen were completely unsupported by tanks or other vehicles. In 2023 Ukraine also dismantled some artilery shells for the submunitions which were then repurposed into bombs that could be dropped by small drones.

In October 2025, Russia has begun to use a submunition similar to the M42 design, apparently of North Korean origin. These submunitons are taken out of their original artillery carrier, modified, and fitted onto FPV drones.
