= M107 projectile =

High explosive artillery round

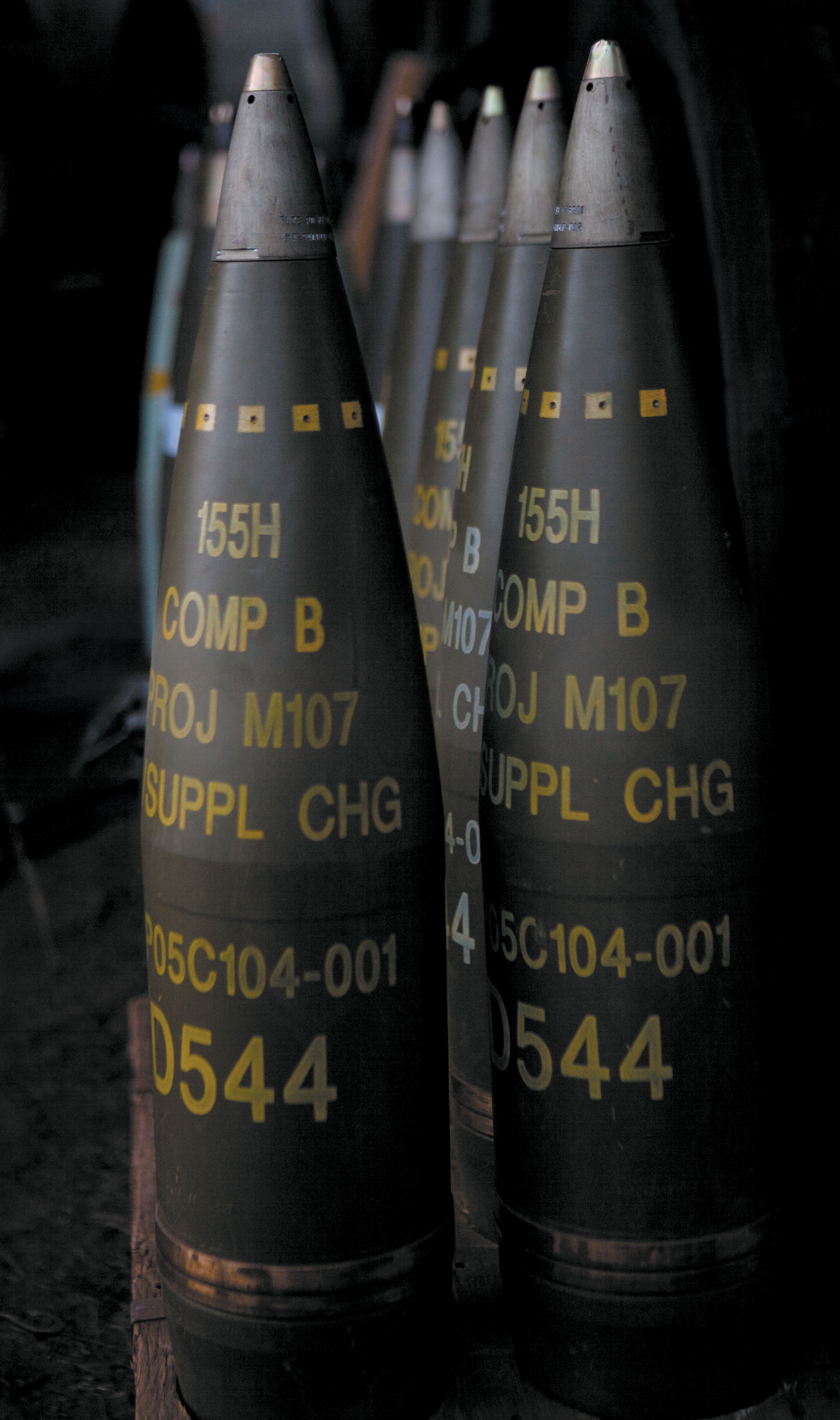
- M107 projectiles, fitted with fuzes.
- Type: 155 mm high explosive projectile
- Place of origin: United States

Service history
- In service: 1958–present

Specifications
- Mass: 43.2 kilograms (95 lb)
- Length: 605.3 mm (23.83 in)
- Diameter: 154.71 mm (6.091 in)
- Caliber: 155 mm
- Effective firing range: 18,100 m (59,400 ft)
- Filling: TNT; Composition B
- Filling weight: 6.86 kilograms (15.1 lb)

The M107 is a 155 mm high explosive projectile used by many countries. It is a bursting round with fragmentation and blast effects. It used to be the standard 155 mm high explosive projectile for howitzers of the US Army and US Marine Corps, but is being superseded in the US military by the M795.

== History ==
The M107 is a development of the M102 155 mm shell that was developed in the 1930s from the French Schneider 155 mm projectile for the Model 1917 Howitzer.

By the 1970s, the M107 was an out-of-date design, and some European armies started replacing their war stocks with modern designs such as the L15 shell. As of 2026, the M107 remains in production, seeing use during the Russo-Ukrainian war, being relatively inexpensive and easy to produce; other advantages are decreased barrel wear and muzzle flash in comparison to long-range artillery munitions.

== Description ==
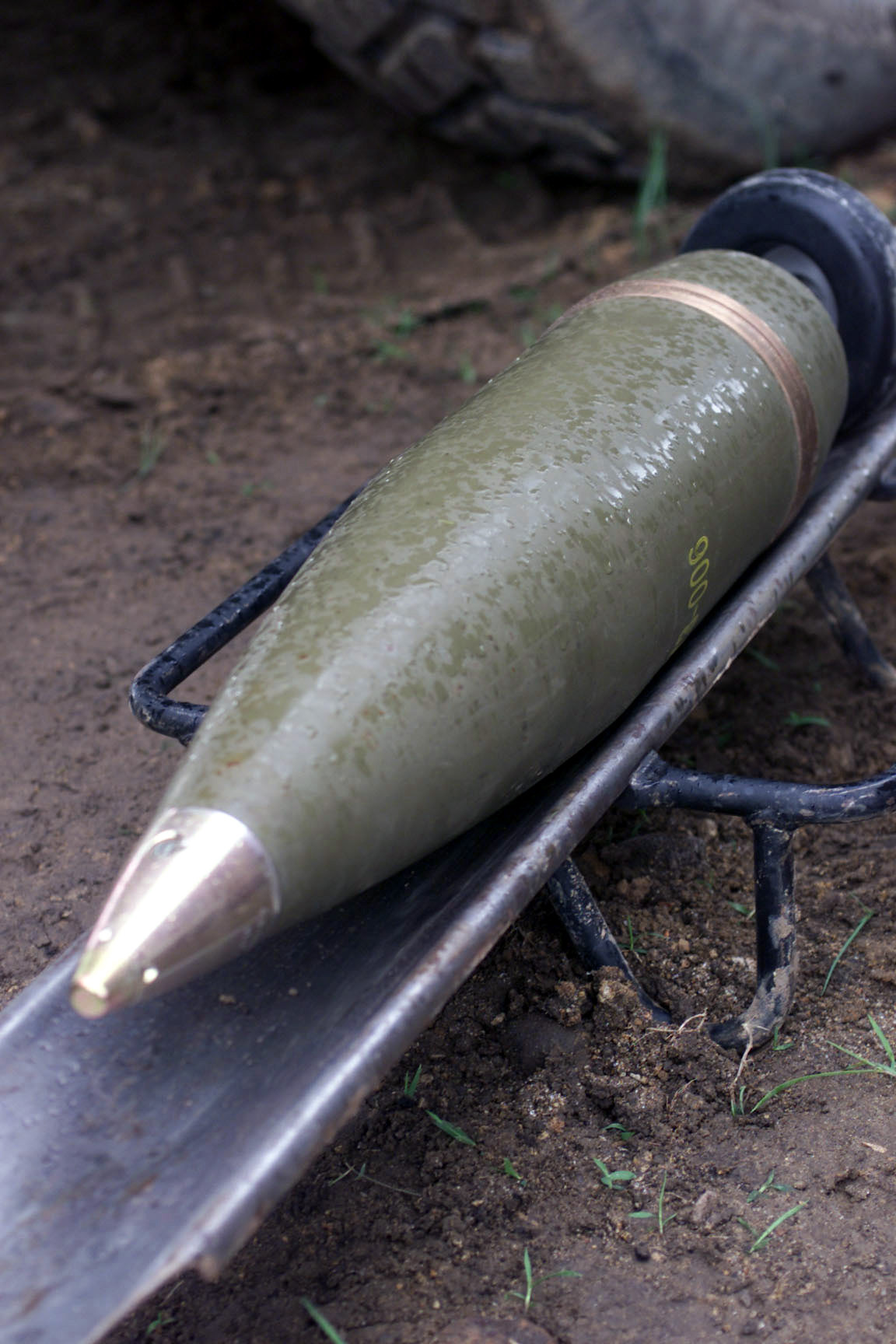
An M107 155 mm high explosive projectile with a M739A1 point detonating (PD) fuze

The body consists of a hollow steel shell containing high explosive (either TNT or Composition B) painted olive drab with yellow markings. A fuze adapter is screwed into the body and brazed in place. An eyebolt lifting plug is screwed into the fuze well to assist in transportation. The plug is removed and replaced with a fuze for firing. The complete projectile weighs 43.2 kg (95 lb), is 800 mm (31 in) long and contains 15.8% explosive by weight. It is a separate-loading projectile—propellant bags or modular artillery charge system (MACS) charges are loaded separately.

The M107 can be fired more than 10 miles (16 km) and on detonation it produces approximately 1,950 fragments.

The M107 was approved for use in 1958 and issued to the army from 1959. Its intended replacement is the M795, manufacture of which began in 1999.

The M198 howitzer can fire an M107 up to 18.5 km (11.5 mi) using M4A2 "White Bag" propellant. Modified M107 rounds with base bleed and new aerodynamics can extend this range to around 32 km (20 mi).

Despite relatively lackluster performance (Jane's describes it as having "an indifferent charge to weight ratio", "unsophisticated aerodynamic shape", "erratic fragmentation") compared to more modern high explosive rounds, it continues to be used by many countries, in particular in training exercises because of its low cost, high availability and smaller danger area than more modern designs. Its limited effectiveness also make it a useful option in peace support operations.

The M107 is manufactured by several nations, sometimes with variations in the fill and or filling method, or other details, and is given a national designation. For example, those produced to UK requirements are designated L21, not M107; German examples were designated DM21.

== Specifications ==
- Maximum range :
  - Fired from M1/M1A1 cannon on M114/M114A1 towed howitzers with Charge 7
  - Fired from M126/M126A1 cannon on M109 self-propelled howitzers with Charge 7
    - 14,600 m (47,900 ft)
  - Fired from M185 cannon on M109A1 - M109A4 howitzers with Charge 8
  - Fired from M119 cannon on M198 towed howitzers with Charge 8
    - 18,100 m (59,400 ft)
  - Fired from M284 cannon on M109A5 and M109A6 howitzers with Charge 8S
    - 24,000 m (79,000 ft)
- Weight as fired: 43.2 kilograms (95 lb)
- Explosive content: TNT 6.86 kilograms (15.1 lb)
- Length (excluding fuze): 605.3 mm (23.83 in)
- Body diameter: 154.71 mm (6.091 in)
- Driving band diameter: 157.98 mm (6.220 in)
- Fuzes (with supplemental charge):
  - PD M51A5, M728 family, M557, M572, M739, M564, M577, M582, M732
- Fuzes (without supplemental charge):
  - M728
- Manufacturer: American Ordnance LLC & Scranton Army Ammunition Plant

== See also ==
- List of artillery
- List of crew served weapons of the US Armed Forces
