= Canon de 155 C modèle 1915 St. Chamond =

Canon de 155 C modèle 1915 Saint-Chamond
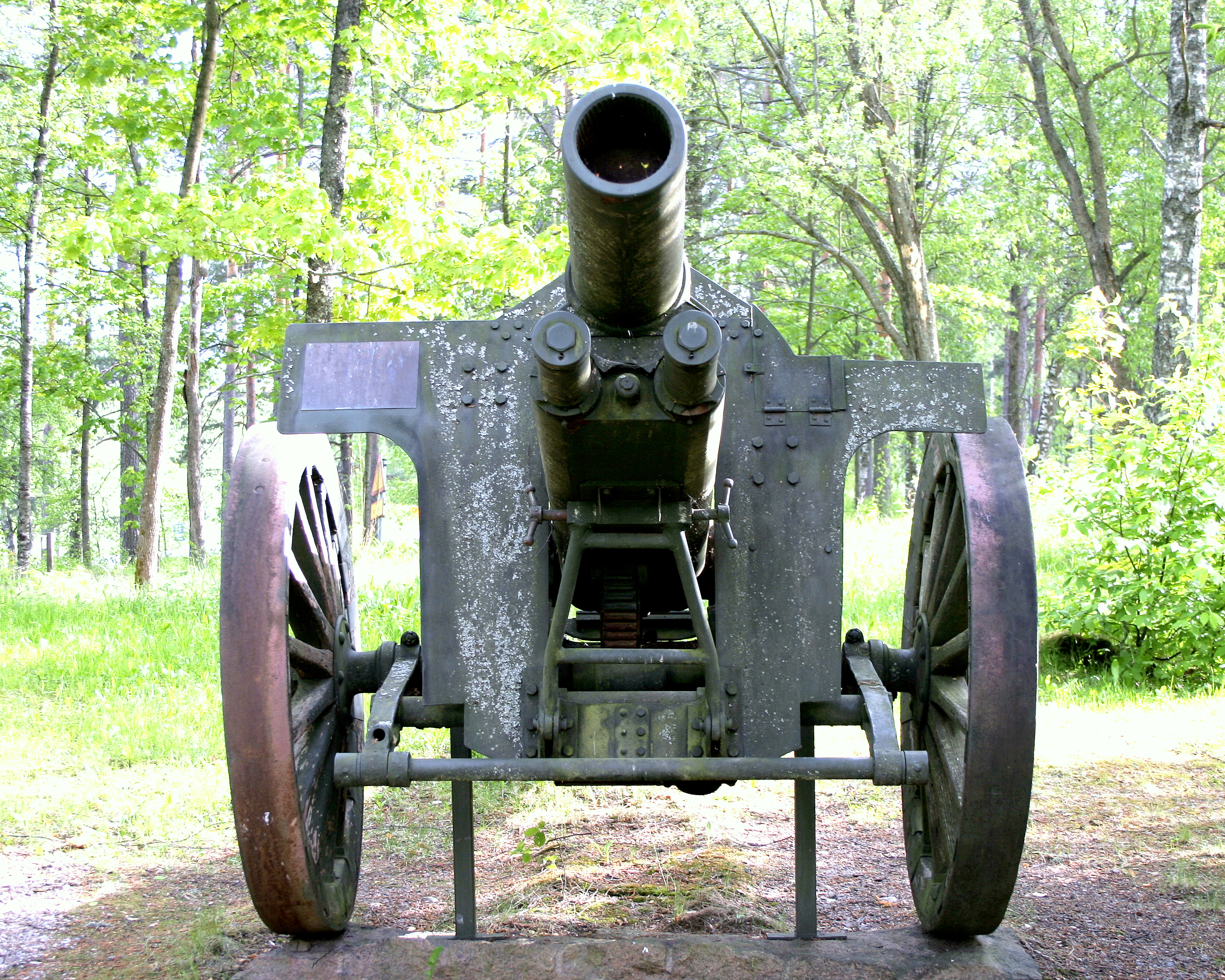
- Type: Field howitzer
- Place of origin: France

Service history
- In service: 1915–1960s
- Used by: France; Nazi Germany; Finland; Romania; Serbia
- Wars: World War I, World War II

Production history
- Designer: Saint-Chamond
- Designed: 1911
- Manufacturer: Saint-Chamond
- Produced: 1916–17
- No. built: 390

Specifications
- Mass: 3,040 kg (6,700 lb)
- Barrel length: 2.517 m (8 ft 3 in) L/17.8
- Crew: 12
- Shell weight: 43.5 kg (96 lb)
- Caliber: 155 mm (6.1 in)
- Breech: semi-automatic vertical sliding-block
- Recoil: Hydro-spring
- Carriage: Box trail
- Elevation: -5° to +40°
- Traverse: 5° 40'
- Rate of fire: 2-3 rpm
- Muzzle velocity: 370 m/s (1,200 ft/s)
- Maximum firing range: 9.3 km (5.8 mi)

The Canon de 155 C modèle 1915 Saint-Chamond was a French howitzer used during World War I. It was based on a private prototype of a 150 millimetres (5.9 in) howitzer presented to the Mexican government in 1911. The French government ordered 400 Saint-Chamond howitzers in 1915, these being delivered starting in late 1916. Small numbers of Saint-Chamond howitzers were given to the Serbian and Romanian armies towards the end of World War I. The Saint-Chamond howitzer served in the French Army after World War I and were mobilised at the outbreak of World War II. Finland bought 24 Saint-Chamond howitzers during the Winter War that served until the 1960s. The German Army captured some Saint-Chamond howitzers after the fall of France and used these mostly as coastal defence guns until the end of World War II.

== Development and Production ==
FAMH (Compagnie des forges et aciéries de la marine et d'Homécourt), commonly known by the FAMH main factory location - Saint-Chamond, developed a 150 millimetres (5.9 in) heavy howitzer as a complementary artillery piece to the Mondragon-designed 75 millimetres (3.0 in) field guns Saint-Chamond had built for the Mexican Army. The prototype howitzer was presented to the Mexican Govt. in 1911 but did not result in a production order. In 1913, the Saint-Chamond prototype howitzer was demonstrated to the French Army but there was no official interest since it was thought the Canon de 155 C Mle 1904 TR Rimailho howitzer satisfied the heavy howitzer requirements of the French Army.

In 1915, the French Army conducted a series of unsuccessful attacks on German trench lines. After the Second Battle of Artois in May 1915, an analysis of artillery performance showed that the Rimailho howitzers were incapable of delivering the volume of fire required by extant artillery doctrine. This doctrine required that heavy howitzers should deliver an intense bombardment on enemy trench lines just before an infantry attack. General Joffre, the French Army Commander-in Chief, demanded new heavy howitzers that were capable of sustained high rates of fire and had sufficient range to minimise the effects of counter-battery fire. 400 155 millimetres (6.1 in) howitzers were ordered from Saint-Chamond in June 1915. However, production delays meant that the Saint-Chamond howitzers didn't enter service until the Autumn of 1916. The Saint-Chamond howitzers were delivered at a rate of 50 howitzers/month and once the order was complete Saint-Chamond produced the Canon de 155 C modèle 1917 Schneider under licence until the end of the war. In 1917, a modified Saint-Chamond howitzer was prototyped, which had an increased max. range to match that of the Schneider howitzer; however, this wasn't taken up because of concerns about disrupting production of the Schneider howitzer.

== Description ==
The Canon de 155 C modèle 1915 Saint-Chamond was a howitzer of relatively advanced design for its time. It used a hydro-spring recoil system mounted below the barrel and had a small gun shield. The box carriage had wooden wheels so it could only be towed as a single load at low speeds by vehicles or by a team of eight horses The barrel was drawn back over the trail for towing. It had a semi-automatic vertical sliding block breech that ejected the cartridge case after firing. A loading tray was attached to the carriage on a swinging mount. It fired a 43.5 kilograms (96 lb) high-explosive (Obus FA Mle 1915) shell to a range of 9,300 metres (10,200 yd). The ammunition was "semi-fixed" the propellent was packaged in small bags in a brass cartridge and the total propellent charge could be adjusted by changing the number of bags.

The Saint-Chamond howitzer was unique among French guns in that it had rear-positioned trunnions. The advantage of with these is that the breech doesn't "disappear" into a box trail as is the case with trunnions mounted at the centre of gravity of the barrel and receiver. This means that the howitzer can be loaded at high elevation angles since the breech position does not change significantly throughout the elevation range. The disadvantage is that the elevation system must be more robust since it must bear greater forces from the barrel weight. To reduce the forces on the elevation gearing, an equilibrator is necessary. This is usually a spring, or in the case of the Saint-Chamond, a pneumatic system. The Saint-Chamond elevation system also moved the gun shield along with the barrel, which meant that the gun shield could be smaller than a fixed gun shield. The traverse system was similar to that of other French guns, a worm gear moved the carriage across the axle.

== Operational use ==
The Saint-Chamond howitzer was 400 kg lighter than the equivalent Schneider howitzer, but its maximum range was 2,400 metres (2,600 yd) shorter. It remained on strength until World War 2. 88 were in service with the artillery units of the Maginot Line and saw some action during the German invasion of France in May 1940.

The Romanian Army was given 14 Saint-Chamond howitzers in 1917. These served until World War 2.

The rebuilt Serbian (later Yugoslav) Army was given a few batteries of Saint-Chamond howitzers in 1917-18. These remained on strength after World War 1 and were upgraded in the 1920s to match the performance of the Canon de 155 C modèle 1917 Schneider howitzer and served until World War II.

Finland bought 24 Saint-Chamond howitzers from France in 1939 at the start of the Winter War. They arrived in Finland at the beginning of March 1940 and were issued to Heavy Artillery Battery 8; the war ended before the unit reached the front. They served with Heavy Artillery Battalions 27 and 29 during the Continuation War. The howitzers served on after World War 2 until the 1960s.

The German Army captured some Saint-Chamond howitzers after the fall of France and used them mostly as coastal defence guns as the 15.5 cm sFH 415 (f) until the end of the war.

== Surviving howitzers ==
Four survive in Finland:

- Vuorenmaa of Artjärvi in Orimattila, Finland, free entry, in woods
- Artillery Museum of Finland in Hämeenlinna, Finland
- Salpa Line museum
- War memorial at the village of Juva, Eastern Finland

One howitzer survives at the Military Historical Museum of Artillery, St Petersburg, Russia
