= M549 =

155 mm rocket-assisted projectile

155 mm M549 HERA
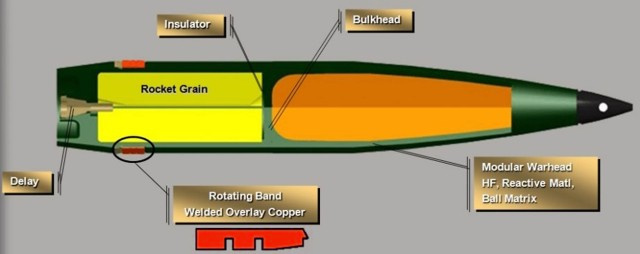
- Color-coded section view of a rocket-assisted projectile ammunition round
- Type: Rocket-assisted projectile
- Place of origin: United States

Service history
- In service: 1970–present

Production history
- Designed: 1960s
- Manufacturer: General Dynamics Ordnance and Tactical Systems

Specifications
- Mass: 96 lb (43.6 kg)
- Length: 34.39 in (873.5 mm) fused; 33.8 in (858 mm) unfused; 10.5 in (266.7 mm) rocket body
- Diameter: 155 mm (6.1 in)
- Muzzle velocity: 2,710 ft/s (826 m/s)
- Maximum firing range: 18.7 mi (30.1 km) (Note: The range of 18.7 mi (30.1 km) is achieved when fired from the 39‐caliber barrels of the M198 howitzer and M109A6 Paladin.)
- Filling: M549 Comp B; M549A1 cast TNT
- Filling weight: M549 16.0 lb (7.26 kg); M549A1 15 lb (6.8 kg)
- References: Janes

The M549 is a high-explosive rocket-assisted (HERA) 155 mm howitzer round developed for use by the US military in order to add additional range to standard howitzers, with a maximum range 30.1 km (18.7 mi) from a M198 howitzer. The projectile has two distinctive pre-assembled components—the high-explosive (HE) warhead and the rocket motor, making it a form of rocket-assisted projectile. The warhead is fabricated from high-fragmentation steel for increased effectiveness in terms of damage caused to target and contains a bulk-filled explosive (either TNT or Composition B).

== Development ==
The projectile was developed to provide extended range for standard and developmental howitzers. The projectile has two distinctive preassembled components—the high-explosive warhead and the rocket motor. The warhead is fabricated from high-fragmentation steel for increased effectiveness and contains a bulk-filled explosive. Currently there are two models.

== Variations ==
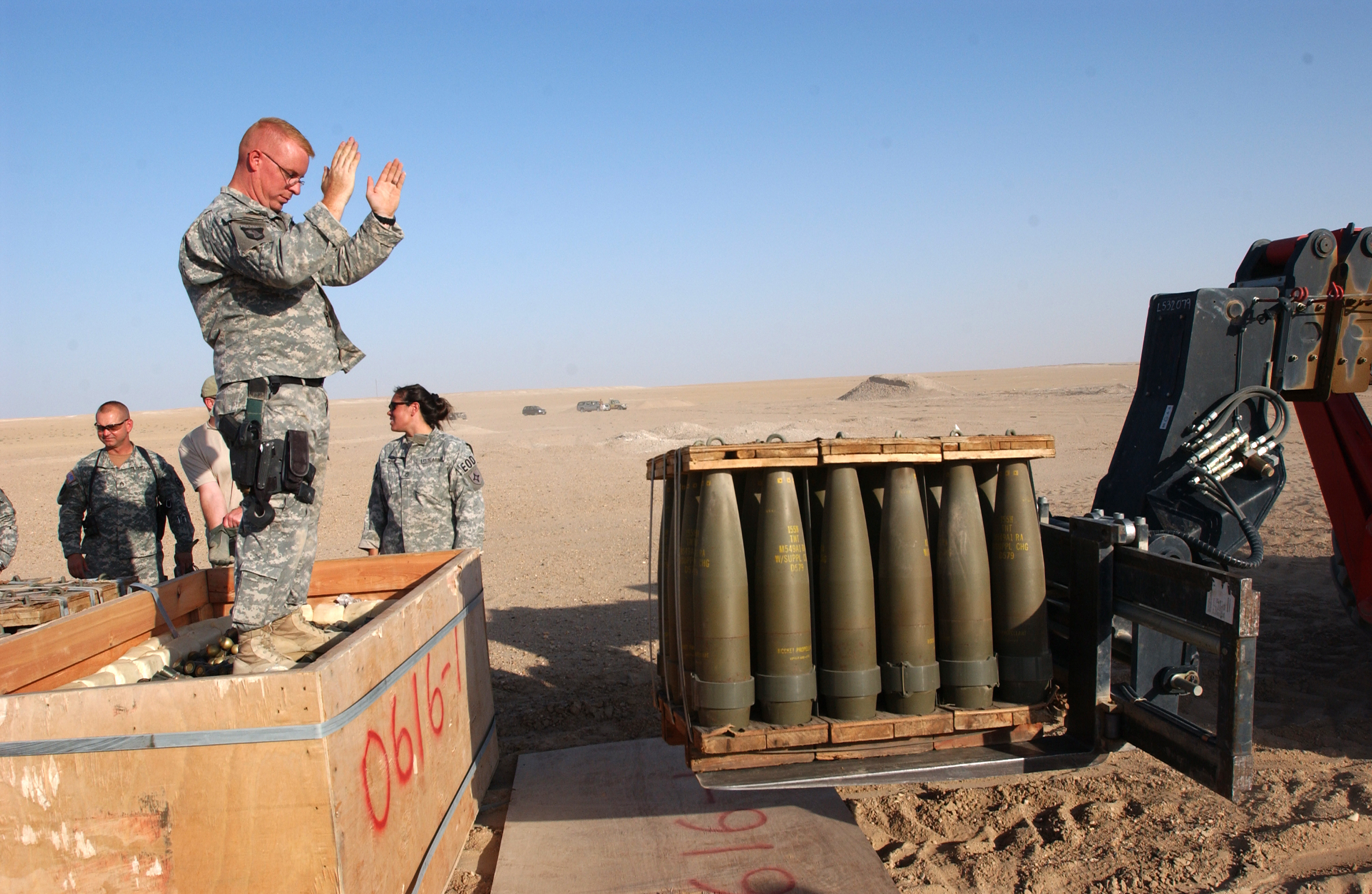
A pallet of M549A1 rounds

The M549 contains 16 lb (7.3 kg) of Composition B and is restricted from use with the new top Zone 8S M203 Propelling Charge. To assure compliance with safety requirements in newer weapon systems, which are capable of using the M203 Propelling Charge, a conversion to TNT fill in lieu of Composition B was introduced in September 1977 with Type Classification of the M549A1. The M549A1 contains about 15 lb (6.8 kg) of TNT.

The 155 mm M549/M549A1 HERA is a separate-loading munition with a two-part forged shell body. The forward HE-filled shell body is constructed from high-fragmentation steel (HF1) and is of a low-drag aerodynamic profile. The rocket-motor body makes up the rear of the shell, this constructed from 4340 steel. The motor body weighs 13.5 kg (30 lb) (approximately 3.175 kg (7.00 lb) of which is propellant), is 266.7 mm (10.50 in) long and is encircled by a welded overlay copper driving band (rotating band) and obturator band, both protected during storage and transit by a polycarbonate composition grommet. At the front of the projectile, the fuse cavity is protected during transport by an energy-absorbing lifting plug, which protects the fuse area from damage during storage, transit and handling. Before loading, the lifting plug is replaced by a fuse, and the protector cap over the rocket-motor nozzle is removed; the 155 mm M549/M549A1 HERA is not intended to be fired in the 'rocket-off' mode. On-target effects are enhanced by the shell's HF-1 steel body. The 155 mm M549 HERA forward shell body is filled with a nominal 7.26 kg (16.0 lb) of Composition B. The M549A1 HERA filler is 6.8 kg (15 lb) of cast TNT. At the instant of firing, the propellant gases ignite a pyrotechnic delay train in the rocket motor. The delay burns for approximately seven seconds. By the end of this seven seconds, the end of the delay train reaches the rocket's primary igniter and subsequently lights the motor's two propellant grains via an igniter pellet.

== Components ==
These projectiles consist of two major components, a warhead filled with 16 pounds (7.3 kg) of Composition B high explosive (M549) or 15 pounds (6.8 kg) of TNT high explosive (M549A1), and a solid propellant rocket motor. These components are threaded together so that the outer steel shells of both form a streamlined ogive. A supplementary charge is installed in the deep cavity of the nose. A rotating band encircles the assembled projectile near the base. A rocket cap is threaded into the base. The cap is removed prior to firing to allow ignition of the rocket motor for extended range. The rocket motor body contains seven pounds of solid rocket propellant arranged in two segmented grains. Each of the three segments of the forward grain contains an ignition pellet. The motor nozzle is recessed in the center of the boat-tail rocket motor base of the projectile, and thrust is along the longitudinal axis.

== Firing ==
When the weapon is fired, the rotating band engages the barrel rifling to impart spin to the projectile for stability in flight. The obturator and rotating band form a seal to prevent leakage of gas pressure past the projectile. The burning propellant accelerates the projectile through the barrel at high velocity. Extended range is obtained through rocket assist; the rocket cap is removed prior to placing the projectile in the chamber, exposing the pyrotechnic delay assembly in the base of the rocket motor. When the projectile is fired, the propellant gases ignite the delay which burns for approximately 7 seconds and then sets off the rocket igniter to initiate the rocket motor, which burns for approximately three seconds. This additional thrust augments the velocity and consequently, the range of the projectile. If a PD or ET is used, the fuse detonates the supplementary charge and the supplementary charge detonates the warhead filler either on impact or the preset time.

== Replacement ==
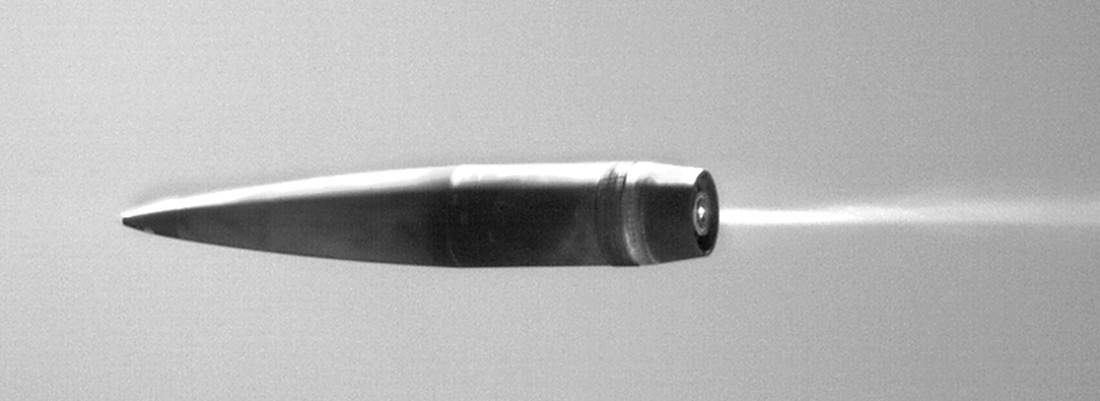
XM1113 extended range artillery round, shown here at a range demonstration, uses a rocket-assist motor

The U.S. Army is developing the XM1113 rocket-assisted projectile to replace the M549A1 shell. The XM1113 increases range from 30 to 40 km (19 to 25 mi) from a 39-caliber barrel using a large high-performance rocket motor delivering nearly three times more thrust, along with a streamlined exterior profile shape for lower drag. It also has better safety by replacing the traditional TNT explosive with an insensitive munitions warhead that is less likely to be accidentally set off. To achieve accuracy at the extended ranges, the Army will look at potentially using the M1156 precision guidance kit, a smart fuse that screws into standard shells to give them near-precision accuracy or the next generation PGK-AJ which will be designed to reliably achieve accuracy at ranges out to 70 km (43 mi). The XM1113 is planned for Limited Rate Initial Production in 2022.

== Used with ==
In the United States Army, multiple howitzers can be equipped with the powerful M549 155mm round including the SPH M109, M114, M198, and the British/American M777 howitzers. These howitzers are equipped with barrels sufficient to fire 155mm rounds, and as such, most other howitzers with the same characteristics can also fire the M549.

== Specifications ==
- Weight without fuse 43.6 kg (96 lbs)
- Body material: forged steel
- Primer: M82
- Explosive content:
  - M549: 7.26 kg (16 lbs) Composition B
  - M549A1: 6.8 kg (15 lbs) TNT
- Length 87.35 cm (34.39 inches)
- Body diameter: 154.89 mm (6.098 in)
- Driving band diameter:
- Fuses (with supplemental charge)
- Fuses (without supplemental charge)
- Manufacturer: General Dynamics Ordnance and Tactical Systems
- Range:
  - M114: 19.5 km (12.1 mi)
  - M109: 23.5 km (14.6 mi)
  - M198: 30.1 km (18.7 mi)
- Accuracy: CEP 259 m (850 ft) at max range with 39 caliber barrel

== See also ==
- List of artillery
- List of crew served weapons of the US Armed Forces
- XM1128
