= Rocket-assisted projectile =

Ammunition incorporating rocket propulsion

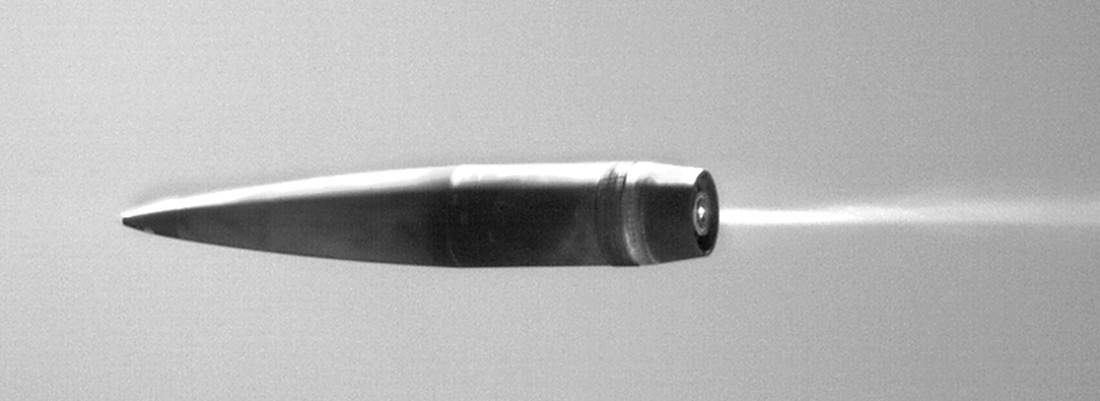
XM1113 extended-range artillery round, shown here at a range demonstration, uses a rocket-assist motor

A rocket-assisted projectile (RAP) is a cannon, howitzer, mortar, or recoilless rifle round incorporating a rocket motor for independent propulsion. This gives the projectile greater speed and range than a non-assisted ballistic shell, which is propelled only by the gun's exploding charge. Some forms of rocket-assisted projectiles can be outfitted with a laser guide for greater accuracy.

== History ==
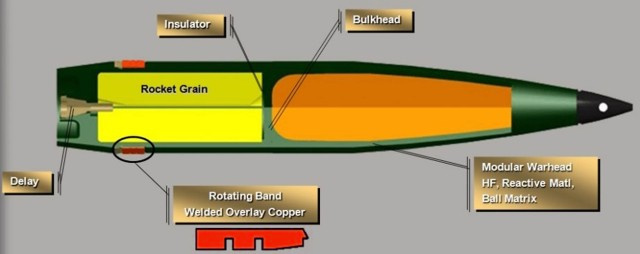
Colour-coded section view of a rocket-assisted projectile ammunition round

The German 15 cm sFH 18 howitzer was the first artillery piece to make use of RAP rounds with the objective of replacing the 10 cm schwere Kanone 18 by making the howitzer range equal or superior to the 10 cm sK 18, freeing up production capacity for more important weapons. Issued in 1941, the 15 cm R Gr 19 FES shell achieved a maximum range of 19 km (12 mi), but it was not entirely successful, and was withdrawn from service shortly after. Ultimately, it proved to be a little more than an experimental design: the instruction manuals and warnings included did nothing to imbue the users with confidence in the new weapon, but provided valuable lessons for the designers, who would successfully develop a RAP round for the Krupp K5.

The German Sturmtiger (1944) used a 380 mm (14.9-inch) Rocket Propelled Round as its main projectile. These rounds were high explosive shells or shaped charges with a maximum range of 6 kilometres (3.7 mi). The gun first accelerated the projectile to 45 m/s (150 ft/s), the 40 kg (88 lb) rocket charge then boosted this to about 250 m/s (820 ft/s).

The Krupp K5 railway gun used rocket-assisted projectiles in the later stages of World War II, although it also used conventional artillery projectiles. In early 1943, the Germans worked on the development of a RAP round for the 38 cm Siegfried K (E) railway gun, but apparently it never reached production stage. The Germans also made experimental RAP rounds for the 10.5 cm Flak 38/39 and 12.8 cm FlaK 40 anti-aircraft guns in an attempt to increase their ceiling.

The North Korean M-1978 / M-1989 Koksan 170 mm (6.7-inch) self-propelled gun can use rocket-assisted projectiles to achieve a range of around 60 kilometres (37 mi); at one time this was the world's longest-range tube field artillery piece.

When NATO standards required member armies to have corps-level artillery that could fire to a minimum range of 30 kilometres (19 mi), nearly all member nations solved the problem with RAP rounds in their 155 mm (6.1-inch) artillery. The Belgian Army was the only NATO member army that did not require RAP, reaching the required range with a conventional round.

The XM1113 RAP round replaced the M549A1 RAP round for the M777 howitzer and other 155 mm (6.1-inch) artillery after 2016. The new round had a range of 39 kilometres (24 mi) instead of the 30 kilometres (19 mi) NATO standard. As of 2016, the XM1113 was scheduled for Limited Rate Initial Production in fiscal year 2022.

A special variant of a RAP is the experimental 155MM HE-ExR artillery shell developed by Nammo, which uses a ramjet for propulsion. The shell is supposed to achieve a range of up to 150 km.

== See also ==
- Base bleed rounds, another way to extend artillery range
- Extended Range Guided Munition, a 127 mm round that was to be used in existing 5-inch guns
- Long Range Land Attack Projectile, a 155 mm round for the Advanced Gun System that uses a rocket motor to increase range
- Gyrojet – Firearm firing gyroscopic rockets in the 1960s
- Rocket artillery
