= Base bleed =

Method of increasing artillery range

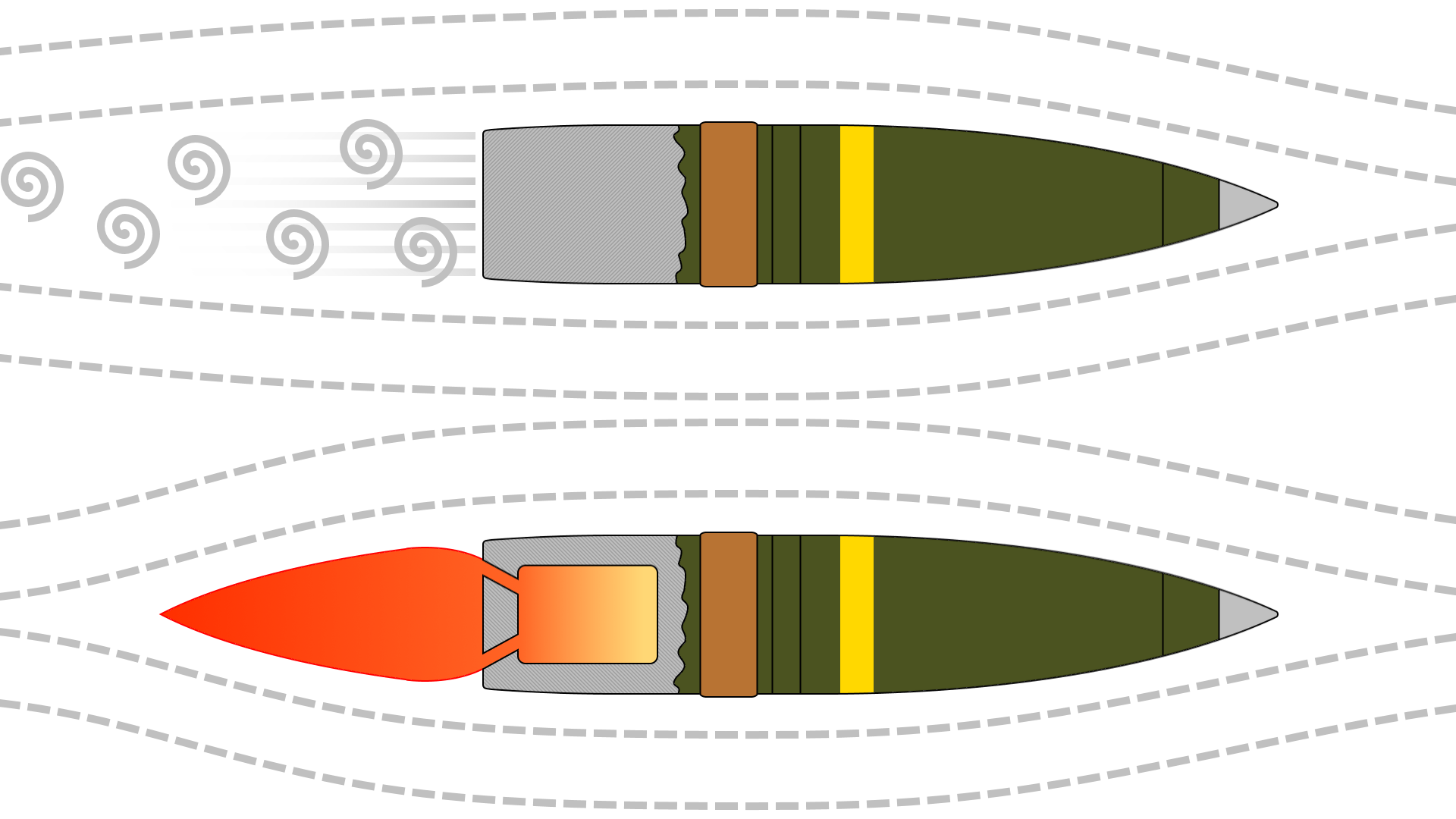
Simplified diagram of a base-bleed artillery shell reducing turbulent vortices

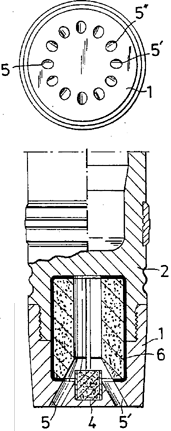
Diagram of a base bleed unit. The top diagram shows the bottom of the shell and the location of the gas vents. The bottom diagram is a cut-away view showing the gas generator mechanism.

Base bleed or base burn (BB) is a system used on some artillery shells to increase range, typically by about 20%–35%. It expels gas into the low-pressure area behind the shell to reduce base drag (but does not produce thrust, unlike rocket-assisted projectiles). Being percentage-based, the range extension is more useful on longer-range artillery where an increase of approximately 5–15 kilometres (3.1–9.3 mi) can be achieved, and it also was found that the reduced turbulence gave the projectiles a more consistent trajectory, resulting in tighter grouping, and efficient shelling more than 40 kilometres (25 mi) away.

Base bleed technology was developed in Sweden in the mid-1960s but took some time to spread and find its niche between cheaper classical ordnance and even more expensive rocket-assisted projectiles. It is now a fairly common option.

== Function ==
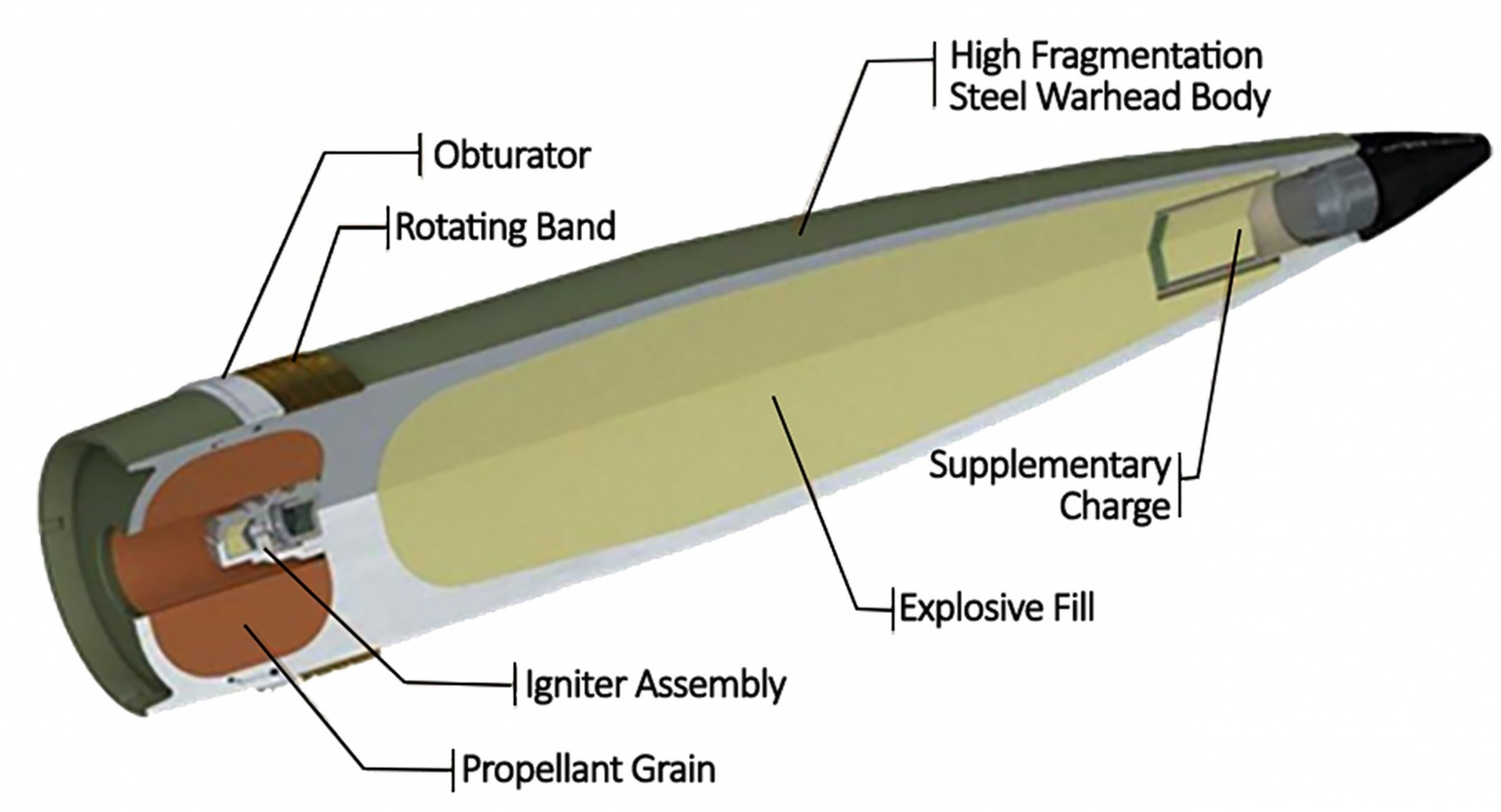
XM1128 showing bleed propellant cavity (red)

Most (50–60%) of the drag on an artillery shell derives from the nose portion of the shell. Artillery shells travel through the air at supersonic speeds; as the shell pushes the air out of its way, it creates shock waves that bleed off the shell's kinetic energy and therefore reduce its airspeed. Shaping the shell properly effectively reduces this component of drag; however, in regular flat-base artillery shells, the other large component is the so-called "base drag", caused by the low-pressure ("suction") area created directly behind the shell as it travels through the air.

Base drag can be reduced --without significantly extending the base of the shell or profiling it (as is done with sabot projectiles) by adding a small ring of metal extending just past the base, and placing a small gas generator to the rear part of the shell. The gas generator provides little to no thrust, but fills the vacuum in the area behind the shell with an inflow of gas, dramatically reducing drag.

This means that, at a cost of only very little space to fit the gas generator in the casing,

- a longer effective firing range can be achieved with the same amount of propellant
- less propellant is needed to achieve the same effective range as with normal munitions
- heavier shells can be fired to the same effective range

== History ==
The principles were developed in Sweden in the mid-1960s by the Försvarets forskningsanstalt (abbreviated FOA) and the Artillery bureau at the Kungliga Materielförvaltningen (later the Försvarets Materielverk (FMV)) while working on a rocket-assisted projectile called "reatil". Their goal was to increase the range of coastal artillery. By 1966, it had been concluded that a small slow-burning charge at the base of the projectile would alleviate the low pressure behind the shell, hence increasing the range by lessening the difference between the pressure due to aerodynamic drag on the nose of the shell and the low pressure behind the base. The first full-scale tests took place in 1969 with modified 10.5 cm steel shells, with excellent results, and the Swedish patent was granted to FOA in 1971 although both application and patent were classified. Since the development was done, the patent was transferred to FMV for procurement to the armed forces of Sweden.

The concept was quickly implemented into the 7.5 cm sjömålsgranat m/66 (7.5 cm anti-ship shell m/66) used in the 7.5 cm tornpjäs m/57 fixed coastal artillery gun, and then rapidly into all anti-ship shells in the Swedish military.

Since FMV was to contract a company in the US to manufacture the gas generator for the 12 cm sjömålsgranat m/70 (12 cm anti-ship shell m/70), used in the 12 cm TAP m/70 fixed coastal artillery gun, the classification secret was removed from the patent. Shortly thereafter the international rights were sold, eventually ending up with the Space Research Corporation (SRC), then owned by aeronautical engineer Gerald Bull.

By the end of the 20th century, the technology was generally available world-wide.

== See also ==
- XM1128 projectile – 155 mm base bleed artillery round
- Gyrojet – Firearm firing gyroscopic rockets in the 1960s
- Rocket-assisted projectile (RAP)
- Rocket artillery
- Traveling charge

== Bibliography ==
- Gibson, Chris (2023). "It's All About that Base". The Aviation Historian (42): 122–129. ISSN 2051-1930.
- Grenander, Gunnar (1987). Vapenlära för armén (in Swedish). Stockholm: Liber. ISBN 91-38-09025-2.
- Hansson, Lars (2008). ERSTA - Från svarvspån till byggnadsminne (in Swedish). Nyköping: LAH Bunkertours. ISBN 978-91-977297-0-3.
