= Singapore Artillery =

Artillery
- Logo of the Artillery Formation
- Active: 22 February 1888 – present
- Country: Singapore
- Branch: Singapore Army
- Type: Artillery
- Role: Indirect fire Target acquisition
- Size: 4 battalions
- Part of: Singapore Armed Forces
- Garrison/HQ: Khatib Camp; Kranji Camp II
- Mottos: In Oriente Primus ("First in the East")
- Colours: Dark Blue
- Website: Official website

Commanders
- Chief Artillery Officer: COL Ong Chiou Perng

The Artillery is a formation of the Singapore Army, comprising four active battalions—the 20th, 21st, 23rd and 24th Battalions—and an undisclosed number of reservist battalions. The primary role of the Artillery formation is to deliver timely, accurate and effective fire in support of the manoeuvre force to accomplish missions. As an indirect fire support system, the gunners rely on the forward observer and target acquisition elements to provide the target's location, which is then passed to the command post to direct the gunners to fire.

The unofficial motto of the Artillery formation is "Once a Gunner, Always a Gunner!"

== History ==
The Artillery formation traces its origins to 22 February 1888, when it was created as the Singapore Volunteer Artillery Corps by the British Armed Forces. It is thus the oldest service arm of the SAF.

After Singapore gained its independence in 1965, Minister for Defence Goh Keng Swee tasked Captain Mancharan Singh Gill with building up an artillery battalion for the young Singapore Armed Forces (SAF). By that time, the only artillery element was an honours battery which fired the British built 25-pounder howitzers that formerly was under the supervision of the Singapore Infantry Regiment, with operational control by Army HQ. This battery forms now part of the 23rd Battalion.

On 1 June 1967, the 20th Battalion People's Defence Force (Artillery) was redesignated as the 20th Singapore Artillery Battalion (20 SAB) and assigned to operate the 120mm Light Tampella Mortar, which Artillery units were subsequently equipped with in the 1970s.

In 1978, the Artillery Training Centre (ARTC) was created to replace the Artillery Reserve Administrative to meet the training requirements of reservists.

Since 1988, the Artillery formation has undergone rapid modernisation in training, operations and weapons development when the Singapore Armed Forces partnered with ST Kinetics and Defence Science and Technology Agency (DSTA) to acquire and/or develop new equipment such as the Field Howitzer 88 and SAFARI Weapon Locating Radar.

From 2007 to 2013, the Singapore Artillery contributed to United Nations peacekeeping operations by deploying 492 personnel and radar-locating weapons to Afghanistan.

The Singapore Artillery celebrated its Centennial in 1988.

== Organisation ==
Gunners in the Artillery formation have different specialisations. Gunners using the M142 HIMARS, SSPH Primus, SLWH Pegasus and Field Howitzer 2000 batteries are trained to maintain and operate the weapon systems to deliver precision fire. Gunners in the STrike ObserveR Mission (STORM) batteries are in charge of coordinating air strikes and artillery fire to deliver maximum damage to enemies in a target area. Gunners in the Field Artillery Target Acquisition batteries maintain and operate radars designed to locate enemy artillery and provide early warnings or opportunities to counter-fire on the enemy artillery. Gunners in the Field Artillery Meteorological System sections specialise in providing timely and accurate atmospheric data, such as wind speed and direction, in order to increase the accuracy of artillery fire. The Artillery formation consists of 4 Divisional Artillery, 4 active battalions, and an unknown number of reserve battalions

List of Division Artillery
Name	Division
3rd Division Artillery	3rd Singapore Division (3 Div)
6th Division Artillery	6th Singapore Division (6 Div)
9th Division Artillery	9th Singapore Division (9 Div)
Division Artillery	21st Division (21 DIV)

List of Artillery Battalions
Name	Equipment	Division Artillery	Division	Base
21st, Battalions SA	FH-2000	3rd Division Artillery	3rd Singapore Division (3 DIV )	Kranji Camp II
290th, Battalions SA	unknown	3rd Division Artillery	3rd Singapore Division (3 DIV )	unknown
223rd, Battalions SA	unknown	3rd Division Artillery	3rd Singapore Division (3 DIV )	unknown
20th, Battalions SA	unknown	unknown	unknown	unknown
23rd, Battalions SA	M142 HIMARS and SLWH Pegasus	unknown	unknown	Khatib Camp
24th, Battalions SA	SSPH Primus	unknown	unknown	Khatib Camp
289th, Battalions SA	SSPH Primus	unknown	unknown	unknown
244th, Battalions SA	SSPH Primus	unknown	unknown	
266th BattalionSA	SSPH Primus	unknown	unknown	

== Equipment ==
Equipment	Image	Type	Origin	Notes	References
Ordnance QF 25-pounder		Howitzer	United Kingdom	for ceremonial use, such as during the National Day Parade	
SSPH Primus		Self-propelled howitzer	Singapore		
M142 HIMARS		Multiple rocket launcher	United States		
FH-2000		Howitzer	Singapore		
FH-88		Howitzer	Singapore		
SLWH Pegasus		Howitzer	Singapore		
Bronco ATTC Mortar Tracked Carrier		Mortar carrier	Singapore	equipped with the 120mm Super Rapid Advanced Mortar System (SRAMS)	
SAFARI Weapon Locating Radar		Ground-based mobile multi-mission radar	Israel	mounted on the Bronco ATTC	
