= Waiouru Military Camp =

Military base in New Zealand

- Waiouru, New Zealand
- New Zealand Army soldiers with NZLAVs during "Exercise Hellfire" at Waiouru Army Camp in 2009

Site information
- Type: Army Camp
- Owner: New Zealand Army
- Controlled by: New Zealand Army

Location
- Location within New Zealand
- Coordinates: 39.4704°S 175.6803°E

Site history
- In use: 1939–present

Map

Waiouru Military Camp is a camp of the New Zealand Army in the central North Island of New Zealand near Waiouru.

All New Zealand Army soldiers complete their initial basic training, the All Arms Recruit Course (AARC), at Waiouru Military Camp. The camp is also the site of the army marae. The marae is the home of Ngāti Tūmatauenga, literally 'the tribe of the God of War', the Te Reo Māori term for the New Zealand Army.

== History ==
The New Zealand government chose the sheep station at Waiouru as the location of a North Island training area for its Territorial Forces in the 1930s. The sheep station had large areas of inexpensive open land, and existing road and rail access to the North Island coastline. The artillery was the first branch of the New Zealand Army to use Waiouru. In 1937, Waiouru farmhand Cedric Arthur wrote:

The Military (artillery) Camp is here again for its annual big shoot, so Waiouru is exceedingly busy with huge lorries, tractors, guns and horses, not to mention soldiers galore.... It has been rumoured around here that the Minister of Defence has bought 15 miles of Waiouru to make a permanent Camp here. (Arthur 1984)

A month after the declaration of World War II in 1939, most of the leasehold Waiouru run was taken back by the Crown.

=== Wartime camp ===
At the beginning of the winter of 1940, 800 construction workers from the Ministry of Works built a training camp with capacity for 7,000 Territorial soldiers. Within six weeks 25,000 tons of building materials had arrived at Waiouru Railway Station. 450,000 tonnes of earth was shifted to make a flat area for the camp. At the same time, hundreds of soldiers camped under canvas in the snow and completed extensive field training.

By Christmas 1940, there were 230 buildings erected, served by 20 km (12 mi) of streets, and 8 km (5.0 mi) each of water mains, power lines and sewers. By mid-1941, seven regimental camps housed 7,000 soldiers. There was a bakery, a hospital, two film theatres and five "institutes", each with a concert hall, library, writing room and tearooms. However, there were no bars; soldiers had to go to Taihape to buy a beer. An Armoured Fighting Vehicle School and a Command and Staff School at Waiouru were established in August 1941. By the end of the war, £1.2 million (NZ$2.4 million) had been spent on developing the camp, and 340 km^{2} (130 sq mi) of land had been acquired for training.

=== Postwar ===
More land was required for the camp by 1949. Plans were made to upgrade the Desert Road track through the artillery range to a major State Highway and build a high-voltage power line to transfer power up the Moawhango valley. The Army Schools at Trentham were to be transferred to Waiouru, compulsory military training was about to commence and, as defence responsibilities shifted to South-East Asia, the Army needed forests for jungle warfare training. These considerations resulted in another 250 km^{2} (97 sq mi) of land to the north and east of the camp being acquired by the New Zealand Government. In 1955, the 1st NZSAS Squadron started jungle training in Paradise Valley, part of the newly acquired area.

Compulsory military training was carried out at Waiouru from 1950 to 1958, and balloted national service from 1962 to 1972. In 1978, the National Army Museum opened at Waiouru, and in 1985 the Officer Cadet School of New Zealand. These were busiest years at Waiouru. 100 recreational clubs were active in the 1970s and 80s: the Ski Club alone had 300 members. At the time, Waiouru had a population of 6,000 people, including 600 children.

In the 1980s some training was discontinued, and some army units were transferred to Linton. By 1990 Waiouru's permanent population had fallen to about 3,000. However, several hundred additional service personnel participated in training at Waiouru at any given time. In 1991, nearly three thousand soldiers were trained in Waiouru on 275 courses.

=== 21st century ===
In April 2004, regarding the future of the camp, Major General Jerry Mateparae stated that Waiouru was a strong factor in defining the Army, and the majority of courses, especially the more challenging ones, are run there.

With the reorganisation of armoured force personnel in 2005, and their departure from Army Training Group, Waiouru's population fell to about 2,000, but it was still often-used training area due to its central location and 600 km^{2} (230 sq mi) of varied landforms. The 1,400 beds in the barracks were frequently full, with more personnel using satellite camps or sleeping in the field.

As of July 2024, Waiouru continues to be the New Zealand Army's main training base, with all Army soldiers completing 16 weeks of initial basic training at Waiouru. Training facilities include weapons ranges, military manoeuvre and live fire training areas, an urban training facility and a helicopter landing area. These facilities support all three Defence Force service branches as well as other agencies and international parties. As of July 2024, Waiouru hosts about 500 civilian and military personnel.

The camp also houses the School of Military Intelligence and Security for the New Zealand Intelligence Corps.

In July 2024, the NZDF confirmed that it would be investing NZ$490 million to expand and upgrade housing at Waiouru Military Camp over the next 25 years. The first NZ$75 million stage involves building 50 new homes for military families in partnership with local iwi (tribe) Ngāti Rangi. The second stage involves upgrading 161 homes.

== Defence Agreement with Singapore ==
As part of a memorandum of understanding signed between the Ministry of Defence (New Zealand) and the Ministry of Defence (Singapore) the live-firing range of the camp had been used by the Singapore Army for the test firing of their 155 mm howitzer guns—such as the FH-88, FH-2000, SLWH Pegasus and the SSPH Primus since 1985. On several occasions, Waiouru army camp has also hosted the visiting Singapore Army's artillery battalion during bi-lateral military training exercises.

=== Accidents ===
On 9 March 1997, a 155 mm artillery round exploded in the barrel of an FH-2000 howitzer during a live firing exercise conducted by the 23rd Battalion, Singapore Artillery, of the Singapore Army at the artillery range of Waiouru Army Camp. This resulted in the death of two full-time Singaporean national servicemen; Third Sergeant Ronnie Tan Han Chong and Lance Corporal Low Yin Tit. 12 other servicemen also were injured in the incident, including a Staff Sergeant from New Zealand Army, who was part of a group of New Zealand Defence Force liaison officer/observer to the visiting SAF battalion. The explosion was attributed to a defective fuse. The loading force of the round was found to be a contributing factor.

On 19 January 2019, while taking part in a live firing exercise as an Operationally Ready National Serviceman, Corporal First Class (CFC)(NS) Aloysius Pang entered the cabin of a Singapore Self-Propelled Howitzer (SSPH) to troubleshoot a fault. At 7.05 pm NZDT (2.05 pm SST), to enable diagnosis of the fault, the barrel of the howitzer was automatically lowered to neutral position within the cabin. Pang was in the path of the receding barrel and sustained severe crush injuries to his chest and abdomen as a result. Pang eventually succumbed to the sustained injuries and died at Waikato Hospital on 24 January 2019 at 1.45 am (NZDT UTC+13) (23 January 2019 8.45 pm SST UTC+8).

== Royal New Zealand Navy ==
The Royal New Zealand Navy's Waiouru Wireless Telegraph Station was commissioned in July 1943 and at the height of the war had an establishment of about 150 personnel, of whom more than eighty were women. Tens of thousands of code groups were handled each day, mostly for the British Pacific Fleet in Japanese waters. A dozen or more circuits were staffed simultaneously, and teleprinter land lines fed the signals to the Navy Office. In 1951, it was designated HMNZS Irirangi (Maori for spirit voice). It is now staffed by only a small contingent of naval maintenance personnel.

== Waiouru Airfield ==
From World War II until 2001, the Royal New Zealand Air Force A-4 Skyhawks and Aermacchi MB-339 fighter jets used the Army's artillery target areas in the Rangipo Desert and east of the Moawhango River as bombing and rocket ranges. The RNZAF maintains Jameson Field inside the camp for its NH-90 and A-109 helicopters and practices landing Lockheed C-130 Hercules aircraft on the sealed Waiouru Airfield (ICAO Code NZRU) to the west of the camp.

== Barracks ==
The barracks in Waiouru are traditionally named after battles, campaigns and in one instance a war.

=== Alamein Barracks ===
Alamein Barracks commemorate the 1942 Second Battle of El Alamein in which the 2nd New Zealand Division played a vital role.

=== Belhamed Barracks ===
Belhamed Barracks commemorate the 2nd New Zealand Divisions actions at Belhamed during Operation Crusader in December 1941.

=== Bologna Barracks ===
Bologna Barracks commemorate the Italian town of Bologna in Northern Italy which the 2nd New Zealand Division helped to liberate in 1945.

=== Cambrai Barracks ===
Traditionally a Royal New Zealand Armoured Corps Barracks, Cambrai Barracks commemorate the 20 November 1917 Battle of Cambrai which was the first time that tanks were used en masse.

=== Cassino Barracks ===
Cassino Barracks commemorate the 1944 Battle of Cassino.

=== Crete Barracks ===
Crete Barracks commemorate the May 1941 Battle of Crete.

=== Faenza Barracks ===
Faenza Barracks commemorate the December 1944 liberation of the Italian city of Faenza by the 2nd New Zealand Division. The NZ Division out flanked the German Garrison in Faenza, killing at least 200 Germans and capturing a further 300.

=== Galatas Barracks ===
Galatas Barracks commemorate the New Zealand actions at Galatas during the Battle of Crete.

=== Gallipoli Barracks ===
Gallipoli Barracks are named after the New Zealand's Army's first major campaign of the First World War.

=== Korea Barracks ===
Korea Barracks commemorated the 4700 New Zealanders of Kayforce who served during the Korean War from 1950 to 1957.

=== Malaya Barracks ===
Malaya Barracks commemorated New Zealand's contribution during the Malayan Emergency.

=== Maleme Barracks ===
Maleme Barracks commemorate the New Zealand actions at Maleme during the Battle of Crete.

=== Megiddo Barracks ===
Megiddo Barracks commemorated the 19–21 September 1918 Battle of Megiddo in which the New Zealand Mounted Rifle Brigade played a significant role.

=== Menastir Barracks ===
Menastir Barracks commemorated the 2nd New Zealand Divisions actions in the Menastir area in December 1941.

=== Minqar Qaim Barracks ===
Minqar Qaim Barracks commemorates the dramatic break out of the 2nd New Zealand Division when encircled by the German 21st Panzer Division.

=== Olympus Barracks ===
Olympus Barracks commemorates the actions of the 5th Infantry Brigade (New Zealand) at Olympus Pass during the Greek Campaign of April 1941.

=== Platamon Barracks ===
Platamon Barracks commemorates the actions of the 5th Infantry Brigade (New Zealand) at Platamon during the Greek Campaign of April 1941.

=== Ruweisat Barracks ===
Ruweisat Barracks commemorated the 2nd New Zealand Divisions actions at Ruweisat Ridge area in July 1942.

=== Senio Barracks ===
Senio Barracks commemorated one of those most difficult of operations - an opposed river crossing, when in April the 2nd New Zealand Division successfully crossed the Senio River in Italy during the Spring 1945 offensive in Italy.

=== Somme Barracks ===
Somme Barracks commemorated the two WW1 Battles of the Somme, after which several New Zealand Infantry Battalions were granted the battle honour "Somme 1916-18".

=== Takrouna Barracks ===
Takrouna Barracks commemorate the 2nd New Zealand Divisions last major action of World War IIs North African Campaign.

=== Tebaga Barracks ===
Tebaga Barracks commemorate the 2nd New Zealand Divisions capture of the Tebaga Gap, opening up the road to the Mareth Line.

=== Terendak Barracks ===
Terendak Barracks are named after the purpose built brigade camp in Malaysia that was occupied by the New Zealand Army from 1960 to 1969.

=== Trieste Barracks ===
Trieste Barracks commemorate Trieste in northern Italy where the 2nd New Zealand Divisions ended it involvement in World War II and it is said fought the first battle of the Cold War

=== Vella Levella Barracks ===
Vella Levella Barracks commemorates the battle conducted by the 14th (New Zealand) Infantry Brigade of the 3rd New Zealand Division to secure Vella Levella in the central Solomon Islands.

== See also ==
- Burnham, New Zealand
- Hopuhopu Camp
- Linton Military Camp
- Papakura Military Camp
- Trentham Military Camp
