= SLWH Pegasus =

Singaporean 155 mm towed howitzer

Singapore Light Weight Howitzer (SLWH) Pegasus
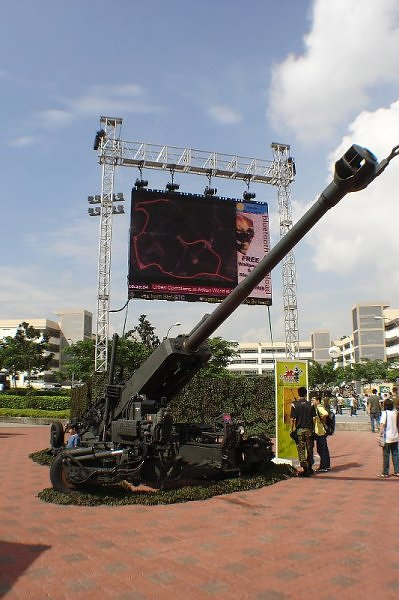
- Singapore Light Weight Howitzer (SLWH) Pegasus
- Type: Howitzer
- Place of origin: Singapore

Service history
- In service: 2005 – present
- Used by: See Users

Production history
- Designer: Defence Science & Technology Agency (DSTA) and ST Kinetics
- Manufacturer: ST Kinetics

Specifications
- Mass: 5.4 t (5.3 long tons; 6.0 short tons)
- Barrel length: 6.045 m (19 ft 10 in) L/39
- Crew: 6–8
- Caliber: 155 mm NATO
- Rate of fire: 4 rpm for 3 minutes 2 rpm for 30 minutes
- Effective firing range: 19 km (12 mi) (with M107)
- Maximum firing range: 30 km (19 mi) (with ERFB BB round)
- Engine: Lombardini 9LD625-2; 21 kW (28 hp)
- Maximum speed: 12 km/h (7.5 mph)

The Singapore Light Weight Howitzer (SLWH) Pegasus is a helicopter-transportable, towed artillery piece. Developed jointly by the Singapore Armed Forces (SAF), Defence Science and Technology Agency and ST Kinetics, it was commissioned on 28 October 2005. The Pegasus has replaced the GIAT LG1 105 mm howitzer previously in service with the Singapore Artillery.

== Design ==
A SLWH Pegasus displayed at the Singapore Airshow 2008.

The 155 mm, 39-caliber Pegasus is typically towed, but it is also equipped with an independent Lombardini 9LD625-2 engine unit to provide short-range self-propelled capability of up to 12 km/h (7 mph). It can be lifted by the Republic of Singapore Air Force's CH-47SD "Chinook" helicopter thus making it the first heli-portable self-propelled 155 mm howitzer. In addition, the Pegasus can also be transported by the C-130 Hercules tactical airlifter.

The Pegasus has a burst rate of fire of three rounds in 24 seconds and a maximum rate of fire of four rounds per minute. It can deliver conventional munitions up to 19 km. Extended range munitions can be fired up to 30 km away. A semi-automatic loading system is provided to increase the rate of fire and reduce crew fatigue.

The design of the Pegasus also incorporates several innovative elements. It is built with titanium alloy and aluminium alloy materials that are lightweight and yet able to withstand the recoil force of the 155 mm artillery system. Special recoil management design is also employed to reduce the recoil force to a third lower than conventional 155 mm howitzers.

== Deployment ==
The Singapore Army conducted its first live firing of the SLWH Pegasus at the artillery range of Waiouru Army Camp in New Zealand as part of Exercise Thunder Warrior in January 2006.

== Users ==
- Singapore: Singapore Army

=== Failed contracts ===
- India: The SLWH Pegasus was the preferred candidate for the 145 ultra light howitzer program of the Indian Army. However, ST Kinetics was associated in a case of corruption against the Director General of Indian Ordnance Factory, and blacklisted from participating in the programme.

== See also ==
- FH-88 – (Singapore)
- FH-2000 – (Singapore)
- SSPH Primus – (Singapore)
