= SSPH Primus =

Singaporean 155 mm self-propelled howitzer

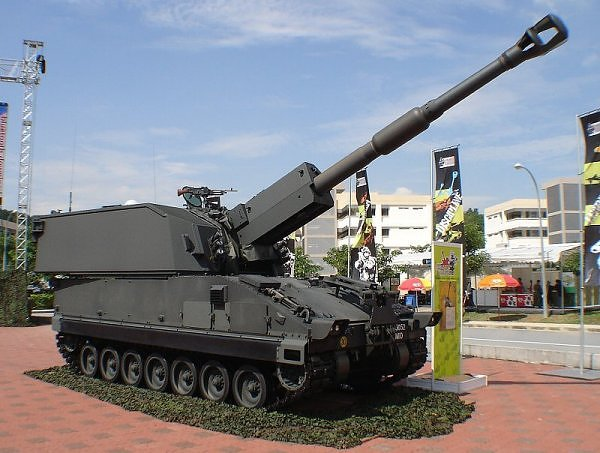
- The SSPH1 Primus on static display during Singapore Army Open House 2007
- Type: Self-propelled artillery
- Place of origin: Singapore

Service history
- In service: 2002 - Present
- Used by: Singapore Armed Forces

Production history
- Designer: ST Kinetics
- Designed: 1996
- Manufacturer: ST Kinetics
- Produced: 2000

Specifications
- Mass: Combat weight: 28.3 tonnes (31.2 short tons; 27.9 long tons)
- Length: Chassis: 6.6 metres (21 ft 8 in); Overall: 10.21 m (33 ft 6 in)
- Width: Chassis: 2.8 m (9 ft 2 in); Overall: 3.0 m (9 ft 10 in)
- Height: 3.28 m (10 ft 9 in)
- Crew: 4 (Commander, Driver, Ammo Loader, Charge Loader)
- Shell: 155 mm NATO
- Caliber: 155 mm 39 calibre
- Breech: Full automatic Interrupted screw with electronic rammer and semi-auto loader
- Elevation: -5°/+75°
- Traverse: 360°
- Rate of fire: Burst: 3 rounds/20 sec Maximum: 6 rpm Sustained: 2 rpm
- Maximum firing range: 30 km (19 mi) with ER projectile
- Armor: High-hardness Steel
- Main armament: 155 mm Howitzer gun
- Secondary armament: 1× 7.62 mm GPMG
- Engine: Detroit Diesel Corporation (DDC) 6V 92TA; 550 horsepower (410 kW)
- Power/weight: 19.43 hp/tonne
- Suspension: Torsion bar suspension
- Operational range: 350 km (220 mi)
- Maximum speed: 50 km/h (31 mph)

The Singapore Self-Propelled Howitzer 1 (SSPH 1) Primus is a self-propelled howitzer armed with a 155 mm howitzer. Developed jointly by the Singapore Armed Forces (SAF), Defence Science and Technology Agency (DSTA) and Singapore Technologies Kinetics (ST Kinetics), it was officially inducted to the Singapore Artillery in 2004. Primus is derived from the Artillery motto In Oriente Primus (Latin: "First in the East").

At the time of introduction in 2002, SSPH Primus was recognized as the world's lightest 155mm, 39 calibre tracked howitzer of its kind.

== Production history and development ==
The idea for a self-propelled howitzer within the SAF was developed in the early 1990s, with the aim of providing better fire support to the armour brigades in the Combined Arms Divisions. This new weapon system would require the ability to keep pace with the high tempo of armoured operations, while providing the range, firepower and accuracy that the artillery is renowned for. The 155 mm self-propelled howitzer was seen as the obvious choice.

The decision to develop the Primus was made after a market survey in 1995 and 1996 of some of the world's best self-propelled guns from the United States (M109 Paladin), United Kingdom (AS90 Braveheart), Japan (Type 75) and Russia (2S3M1) found them either too heavy or too wide for local terrain.

Leveraging its experience with designing, developing and producing various towed artillery systems (the FH-88 and FH-2000) for the SAF, ST Kinetics, together with DSTA began the development of the Primus in earnest in 1996.

By April 2000, the first working prototype was rolled out, using a vehicle chassis adapted from a United Defense armoured chassis (the Universal Combat Vehicle Platform; UCVP) which includes components from the US M109 Paladin howitzer, M2 Bradley IFV & M8-AGS. The next 2 years saw the system undergoing a series of comprehensive tests to ensure that the Primus was able to withstand the rigors required of it. As land in Singapore is scarce, firing tests were first done at the Waiouru Army Camp live-firing range in New Zealand as part of Exercise Thunder Warrior in February 2004. The guns have also participated in Exercise Wallaby at the Shoalwater Bay Training Area in Queensland, Australia.

In September 2002, the Primus was officially certified to have met the SAF's criteria, and was formally adopted in the SAF. Since then, this Artillery platform is utilised by the 21st Battalion Singapore Artillery as their primary weapon system for training and operation purposes.

== Design ==
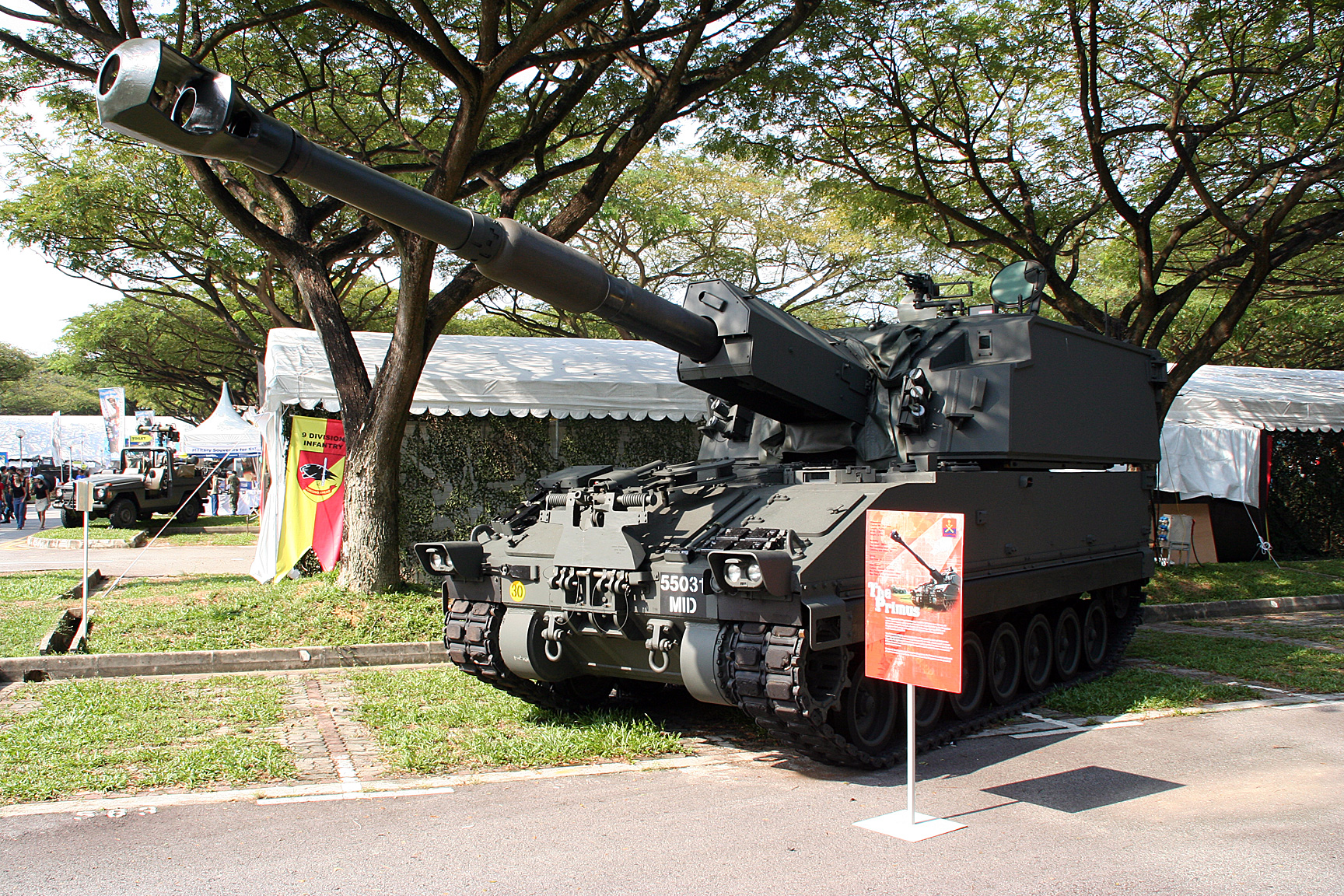
SSPH 1 on display at Marina South as part of Singapore's National Day Parade celebrations in 2005

The chassis is based on the proven United States M109 155 mm self-propelled howitzer. This has been upgraded in a number of key areas and has a new power pack similar to that fitted to ST Kinetics Bionix infantry fighting vehicle (IFV), which is already in SAF service. The use of common subsystems for the Primus and Bionix IFV offers several advantages, including easier training and reduced logistics.

The power pack of the Primus consists of a Detroit Diesel Corporation 6V 92TIA diesel engine developing 550 horsepower coupled to a General Dynamics Land Systems HMPT-500-3EC fully automatic transmission.

The maximum road speed of the Primus is 50 kilometres per hour (31 mph), with an operating range of 350 kilometres (220 mi). Its combat weight of 28.3 tons allows it to use the SAF's military bridging systems. The relatively light combat weight also allowed the flexibility of being air-portable by an Airbus A400M Transport aircraft.

The turret is fitted with a locally developed 155 mm 39-calibre barrel with a muzzle brake and fume extractor. This meets the NATO Joint Ballistics Memorandum of Understanding. The range of the Primus' gun depends on the type of projectile and charge combination used, and is about 19 kilometres (12 mi) with the old M107 high explosive (HE) projectile and 30 km (19 mi) with an extended range full bore base bleed projectile. In addition to smoke, HE and illumination projectiles, the locally developed 155 mm cargo round can also be fired.

A semi-automatic loading system is provided to increase the rate of fire and reduce crew fatigue. The fused projectiles are loaded and rammed automatically; the modular charges are loaded manually. The Primus has a burst rate of fire of three rounds in 20 seconds and a maximum rate of fire of 6 rounds per min. The bustle mounted magazine holds up to 22 rounds of 155 mm projectile.

The digital fire control system automates the complete projectile loading process and gun laying operation. An ammunition inventory management system keeps track of all onboard ammunition as well as ammunition expenditure during firing. The weapon is laid to the target using an automatic fire control system, which includes an onboard positioning and navigation system. This can receive target information from the battery or regimental command post. It takes less than 60 seconds to come into action and open fire and 40 seconds to be re-deployed.

== Incidents ==
On 19 January 2019, Singapore Army NSman Corporal First Class (CFC (NS)) and Mediacorp actor Aloysius Pang was killed after he was crushed by the gun barrel of a Primus while performing maintenance inside the vehicle during his overseas reservist training in New Zealand.

== Misconception ==
The Primus has been mistaken as artillery being mounted on a Bronco or a Bionix chassis, and in the earlier days of development as a Bionix MBT variant. This was brought about by the fact that the UCVP (which the Primus was based on) bears a superficial resemblance to that of the Bionix and the fact that ST Engineering had indeed at the time been experimenting on a light tank variant of the Bionix.

== See also ==
- FH-88 – (Singapore)
- FH-2000 – (Singapore)
- SLWH Pegasus – (Singapore)

== Bibliography ==
- C, Foss (10 January 1999). "Equipment Profile of SSPH PRimus". Jane's Defence Weekly.
