= STK 40 AGL =

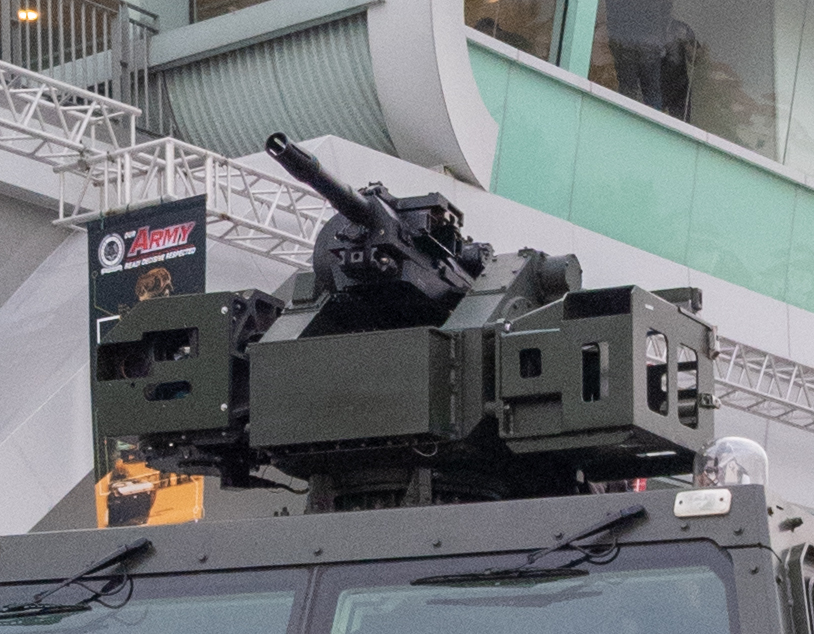
- Type: Automatic grenade launcher
- Place of origin: Singapore

Service history
- In service: 1991–present
- Used by: See Users
- Wars: Anti-guerrilla operations in the Philippines; 2025 Cambodia–Thailand border conflict

Production history
- Designer: Chartered Industries of Singapore
- Designed: 1986-1989
- Manufacturer: Chartered Industries of Singapore (former); ST Kinetics (former); ST Engineering
- Produced: 1991–present

Specifications
- Mass: 33 kg (72.75 lb)
- Length: 966 mm (38.0 in) with stock
- Barrel length: 350 mm (13.8 in)
- Width: 376 mm (14.8 in)
- Cartridge: 40x53mm grenade
- Action: Blowback operation
- Rate of fire: 350-500 rounds/min
- Muzzle velocity: 242 m/s (794 ft/s)
- Maximum firing range: 2,200 m (7,217.8 ft)
- Feed system: Linked belt
- Sights: Folding leaf sight

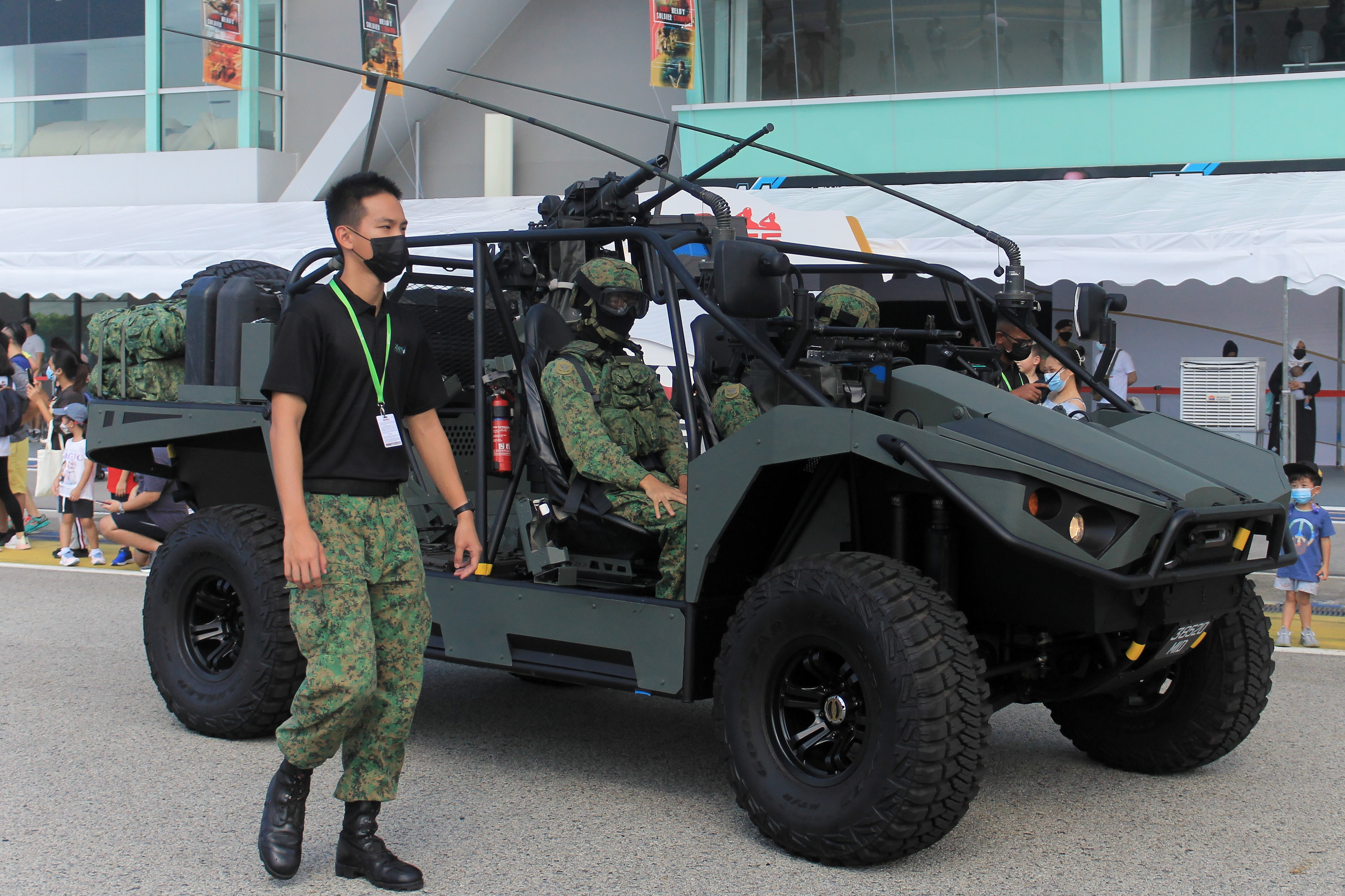
Light Strike Vehicle MK. II with a STK 40 AGL mounted

The STK 40 AGL, formerly the CIS 40 AGL (Note: Using the Wayback machine on this CIS 40 AGL page indicates that the CIS 40 AGL name was used until early 2017, when it changed to the STK 40 AGL name as seen here.) is a 40 mm automatic grenade launcher, developed in the late 1980s and produced by the Singaporean defence firm Chartered Industries of Singapore.

The launcher is employed primarily by the Singapore Armed Forces and the police and security forces of several other countries.

== History ==
The 40AGL was made in 1990, followed by the 40LWAGL in 2001 (previously called the 40 mm Super Light Weight AGL).

On 19 June 2000, STK announced the release of an upgrade kit, known as the 40mm Automatic Grenade Launcher Air-Bursting System (40mm AGL-ABS), with new electronic fire control system, gun computer, muzzle programming coil, and optical sighting system.

On 13 December 2010, the Kuwait Defense Ministry released a statement that the CIS 40 AGL was offered for the Kuwaiti military.

In September 2013, Thales and ST Kinetics agreed to develop, manufacture and market ST Kinetics' 40mm low-velocity air-bursting ammunition for the Australian and New Zealand markets. ST Kinetics also announced that the company secured a total of more than US$30 million worth of international orders from Canada and United States for its 40mm ammunition in October 2013.

== Design ==
The 40AGL is mounted in combination with the 12.7-mm 50MG in the ST Kinetics' 40/50 cupola weapon system, installed on the M113 and Bionix. The 40AGL weighs 33 kg without mount or ammunition.

The STK 40 AGL can be mounted on an M3 tripod, a lightweight tripod, a lock/fire mount, softmount, ringmount or on a RWS.

The range of 40 mm rounds include low velocity, high velocity, less-than-lethal, camera, self-destruct, airburst and enhanced blast insensitive explosive rounds.

In addition to 40mm grenades, it can fire Air-Bursting Munition Systems to increase firepower and lethality.

== Variants ==
=== Mark II ===
The STK 40 AGL has an almost 6 kg lighter Mark II variant, with a barrel removal system and improved handling, performance, aesthetics and ergonomics. The components, when disassembled, consist of the operating group, barrel, receiver group, top cover group, andtrigger group.

=== 40LWAGL ===
Previously called the 40 mm Super Light Weight AGL, the objective of ST Kinetics in designing the 40LWAGL was to keep the grenade launcher's weight to below 20 kg, or half the weight of conventional AGLs.

=== 3GL ===
In 2008, ST Kinetics entered into a teaming agreement with Electro-Optic Systems (EOS) and Metal Storm (MS) to develop a 3-shot under-barrel grenade launcher called the 3GL.

The 3GL is intended to replace the M203 under barrel grenade launcher for most military rifles including the M16, AK-47, SAR 21 and Steyr AUG. It can also be detached to operate as a stand-alone weapon.

The 3GL is a semi-automatic grenade launcher firing individually loaded grenades, with up to three rounds being able to be loaded and fired semi-automatically. It can be attached to weapons via RIS rails or to a stand-alone folding stock.

=== Redback Lightweight ===
St Kinetics also collaborated with Australia's Metal Storm and Electro Optics System to develop a new high-speed and recoilless 40 mm grenade launcher.

== Users ==
- Bangladesh: STK 40 AGL Mk 2 used by the Bangladesh Army.
- Chile
- Cyprus
- Georgia: Used on Nurol Ejder and Otokar Cobra AFVs
- Indonesia: Made under license by PT Pindad for the Indonesian military as Pindad SPG-3 in 1994.
- Italy
- Mexico
- Morocco
- Nigeria
- Papua New Guinea: Used by the Royal Papua New Guinea Constabulary.
- Peru
- Philippines: Philippine Army, Philippine Marine Corps
- Singapore: Used as a main armament on the Bionix 40/50 IFVs.
- Sri Lanka
- Thailand
- Uruguay
