= FH-2000 =

Singaporean 155 mm towed howitzer

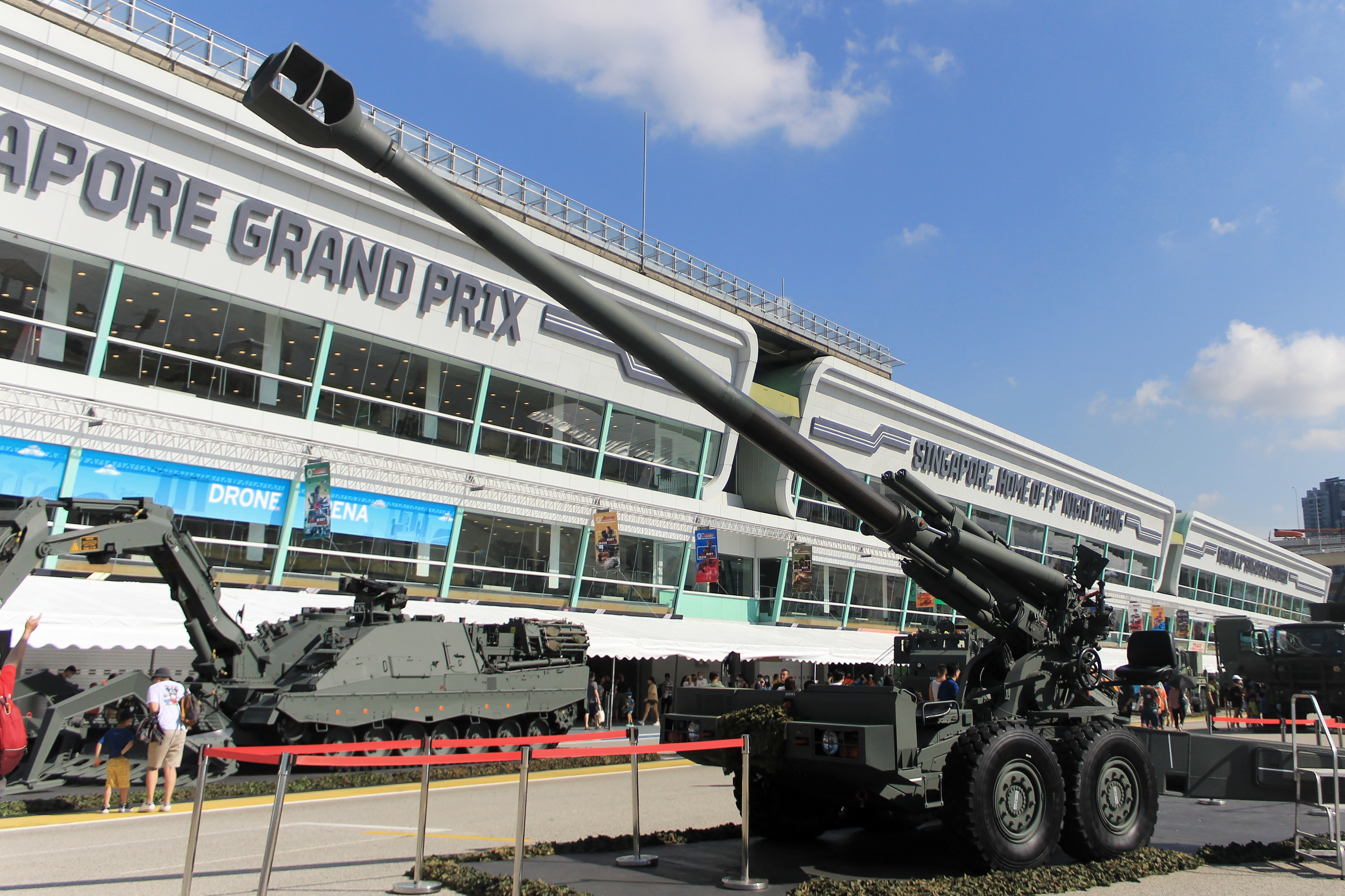
- The FH-2000 155mm/52calibre Howitzer
- Type: Howitzer
- Place of origin: Singapore

Service history
- In service: 1993 – present
- Used by: See Operators

Production history
- Designer: ST Kinetics
- Designed: 1990
- Manufacturer: ST Kinetics
- Developed from: FH-88
- Produced: 1993–1995

Specifications
- Mass: 13,200 kg (29,100 lb)
- Length: 12.90 m (42 ft 4 in) (firing)
- Barrel length: 8.06 m (26 ft 5 in) L/52
- Width: 9.73 m (31 ft 11 in) (firing)
- Crew: 6
- Caliber: 155 mm NATO
- Breech: Semi-automatic Interrupted screw with electronic rammer
- Carriage: 6 wheeled split trail
- Elevation: -3°/+70°
- Traverse: ±20° from centerline
- Rate of fire: 6 rpm for 3 minutes 2 rpm for 30 minutes
- Effective firing range: 19 km (12 mi) (with M107)
- Maximum firing range: 40 km (25 mi) (with ERFB BB round)
- Feed system: hydraulically powered flick rammer assisted loading
- Engine: Air-cooled turbo charged diesel 75 hp (56 kW)
- Maximum speed: 10 km/h (6.2 mph)

The FH-2000 or Field Howitzer 2000 was developed by Singapore Technologies for the Singapore Army. It is a 155 mm/52-calibre towed howitzer gun. It fires projectiles to a maximum range of 42 kilometers using special extended range ammunition, that was field tested in New Zealand. It has a crew of eight and uses a 75 hp diesel auxiliary power unit to give it a self-propelled speed of 16 kilometers an hour movement without towing.

It's reported that the FH-2000 will be replaced over time by the Next Generation Howitzer project.

== Development ==
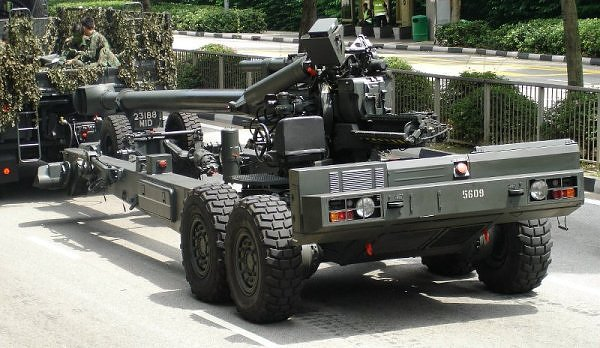
The FH-2000 in towing configuration

The FH-2000 is a development of the FH-88 gun system, which was first produced in 1983 and uses many of the same components. Development of the FH-2000 began in 1990, with the first prototype produced in 1991. The initial prototype was developed further, and acceptance tests were completed in December 1993. The gun differs in a number of ways from the earlier FH-88 most notable is the longer 52 calibre barrel as compared to the 39 calibre barrel of the FH-88.

Additionally, ST Kinetics assisted Turkey in the design and manufacture of its own 155mm/52calibre Panter towed howitzer system, which is understood to be based on the FH-2000 design but upgraded locally with an uprated diesel Auxiliary Power Unit (APU) of 160 hp instead of the original 75 hp, thus giving it a self-propelled speed of 18 km/h as compared to 10 km/h for the FH-2000.

== Design ==
The firing platform, when fully deployed, support the howitzer using a tripod mechanical structure. Firing loads are transmitted to the ground through this tripod, isolating the hydraulic cylinders of the platform, which provides for greater reliability. The FH-2000 shares compontents with the FH-88, including the sighting system and APU.

The FH2000 can be fitted with a series of sighting systems from optical to electro-optical, which are linked to the fire control computers. The breech mechanism is semi-automatic and it opens automatically during counter recoil.

An electronically controlled and hydraulically powered flick rammer rams the projectile into the barrel chamber with high consistency.

== History ==
=== Deployment ===
By 1995, 18 guns were deployed with the 23rd Singapore Artillery Battalion in three batteries of six guns. The gun has been offered for export, and the Indonesian army has taken delivery of a number of these units.

=== 1997 incident ===
On 9 March 1997, a 155mm artillery round exploded in the barrel of a FH-2000 gun howitzer during a live firing exercise conducted by the 23rd Battalion of Singapore Artillery at the artillery range of Waiouru Army Camp, near Waiouru in New Zealand. This resulted in the deaths of two full-time national servicemen, Third Sergeant Ronnie Tan Han Chong and Lance Corporal Low Yin Tit. 12 other servicemen were injured in the incident, including a Staff Sergeant from New Zealand Army, who was acting as the New Zealand Defence Force liaison officer/observer to the visiting SAF battalion.

A Committee of Inquiry found that the most probable cause of the incident was a faulty artillery fuze that was fitted to the 155 mm projectile which, when loaded into the gun howitzer, detonated prematurely by action of the flick rammer. Subsequently, Chartered Industries of Singapore conducted an X-ray check on the same batch of fuzes from where the faulty fuze was taken from and found that approximately 1.3% of these fuzes were faulty.

The families of the two deceased SAF servicemen, as well as other injured servicemen, were compensated. Various SAF and New Zealand personnel were also awarded, in recognition of their acts of bravery and professionalism during the incident. Lieutenant-Colonel Toh Boh Kwee, First Warrant Officer Mohinder Singh, First Sergeant Teo Boon Hong and Lieutenant Leroy Forrester NZDF received the Pingat Jasa Perwira (Tentera) for risking their lives to help injured soldiers immediately after the explosion.

== Operators ==
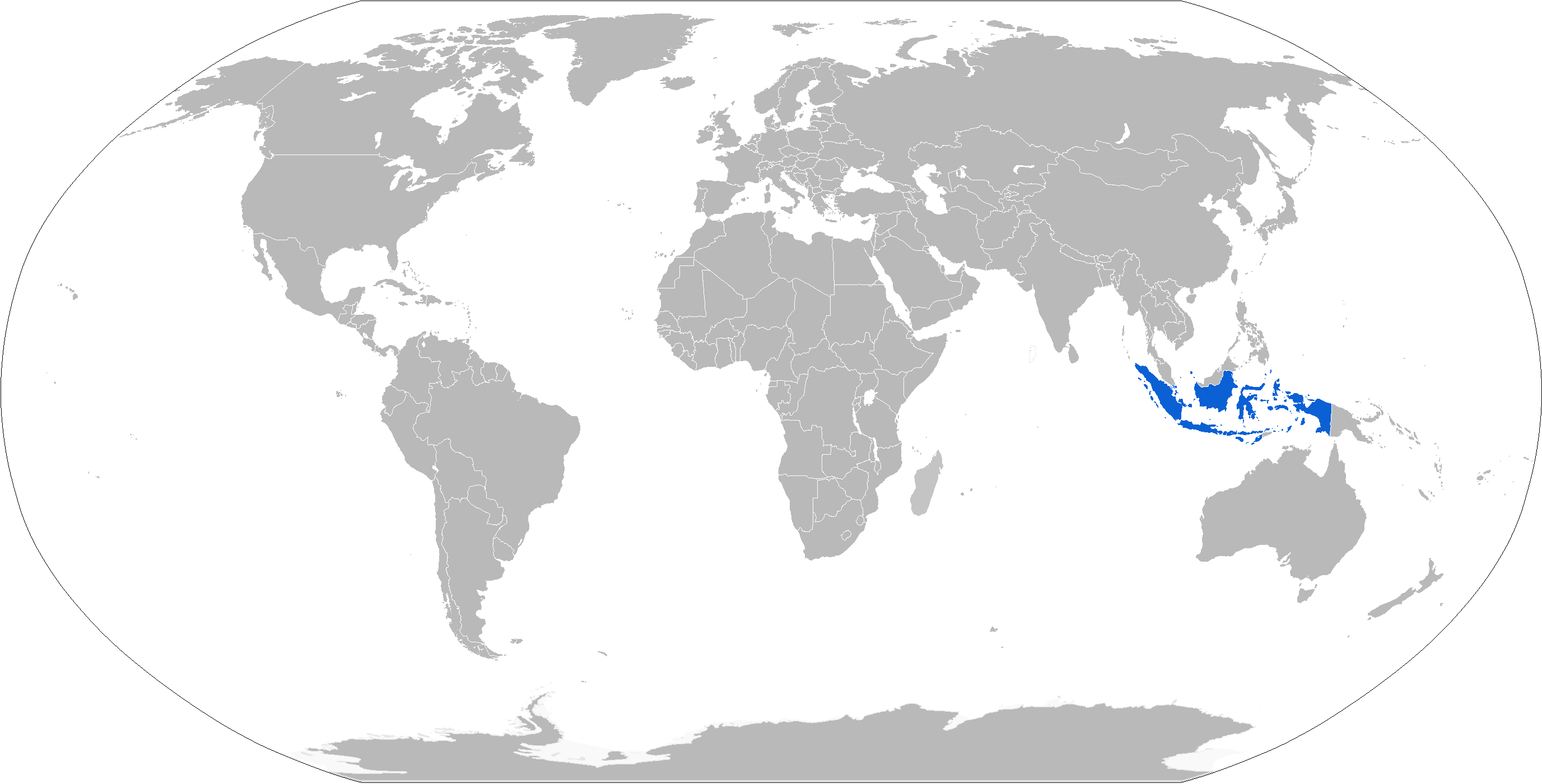
Map with FH-2000 operators in blue

- Singapore: Singaporean Army
- Indonesia: Indonesian Army

=== Failed Exports ===
- India: The FH-2000 was competing to win a contract against BAE's FH77 worth Rs 9,000 crore (USD$2 Billion), but ST Kinetics was being investigated by the Central Bureau of Investigation for alleged corruption links against former Ordnance Factory Board chief Sudipto Ghosh.

== See also ==
- FH-88
- SLWH Pegasus
- SSPH Primus
