= FH-88 =

Singaporean 155 mm towed howitzer

- Type: Howitzer
- Place of origin: Singapore

Service history
- In service: 1988 - present
- Used by: See Users

Production history
- Designer: ST Kinetics
- Designed: 1983
- Manufacturer: ST Kinetics
- Developed into: FH-2000
- Produced: 1987

Specifications
- Mass: 12,800kg (12.59 tons)
- Barrel length: 6.10m (20ft)
- Crew: 8
- Shell: 155 mm NATO
- Caliber: 155 mm 39 calibre
- Breech: Semi-automatic Interrupted screw with electronic rammer
- Carriage: 6 wheeled split trail
- Elevation: -3°/+70°
- Traverse: ±20° from centerline
- Muzzle velocity: 765m/sec (2510ft/sec)
- Maximum firing range: 19,000m (20,780yds)

The FH-88 or Field Howitzer 88 was the first locally designed howitzer developed for the Singapore Army. It is a 155 mm/39-calibre towed howitzer gun.

== Development ==
Ordnance Development and Engineering of Singapore (ODE, now Singapore Technologies Kinetics) began development of the FH-88 in 1983 with five prototypes being produced over a period of four years. These were followed by a preproduction batch of six 155 mm FH-88 gun-howitzers that incorporated a number of improvements as a result of trials with the prototype weapons.

First production FH-88s were completed in 1987, with the weapon becoming operational with the Singapore Army the following year, replacing the Soltam M-71. The howitzer was publicly presented in 1988.

== Operators ==
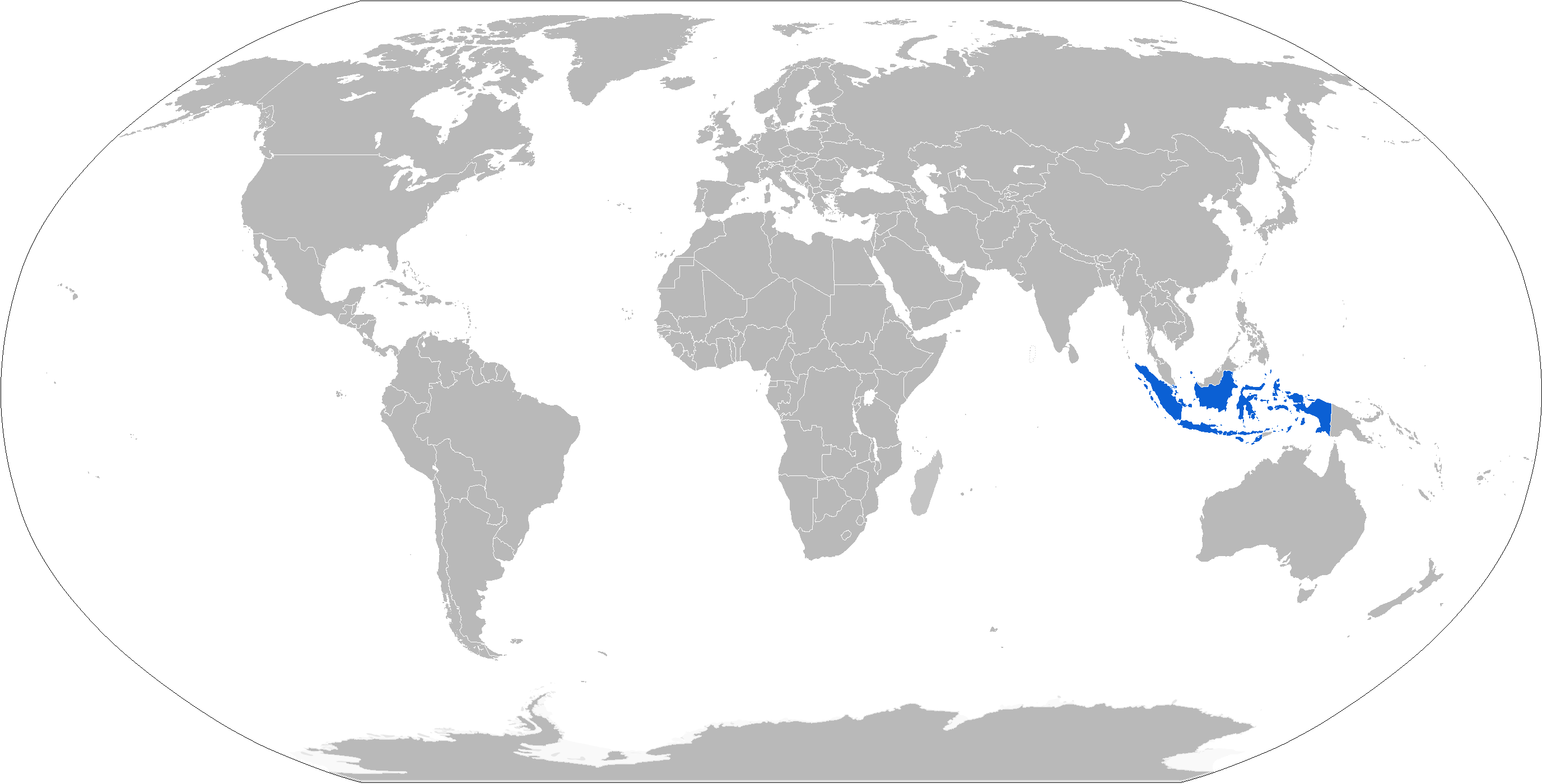
Map with FH-88 operators in blue

- Singapore: Known to use 52 FH-88s.
- Indonesia: Known to have 5 FH-88s delivered in 1997.

== See also ==
- FH-2000
- SLWH Pegasus
- SSPH Primus
