= Defence Science and Technology Agency =

Statutory board in Singapore

Agency overview
- Formed: 15 March 2000; 26 years ago
- Preceding agencies: Defence Technology Group; Systems and Computer Organisation; Defence Medical Research Institute, Defence Administration Group
- Jurisdiction: Government of Singapore
- Headquarters: 1 Depot Road, Singapore 109679
- Agency executives: Melvyn Ong, Chairman; Ng Chad-Son, Chief Executive
- Parent agency: Ministry of Defence (Singapore)
- Website: www.dsta.gov.sg
- Agency ID: T08GB0011A

Defence Science and Technology Agency (DSTA) is a statutory board under the purview of the Ministry of Defence of the Government of Singapore.

DSTA is responsible for performing acquisitions management, systems management, systems development for the Singapore Ministry of Defence (MINDEF) and the Singapore Armed Forces (SAF).

== History ==
DSTA was formed as a statutory board on 15 March 2000 by combining the Defence Technology Group from MINDEF with two other organisations, the Systems and Computer Organisation (SCO) and the Defence Medical Research Institute (DMRI) from the Defence Administration Group.

In July 2026, DSTA and the Digital and Intelligence Service partnered with IBM to explore the use of quantum computing for complex military mission planning and logistics optimization. The collaboration provided access to IBM's quantum-computing resources and was intended to develop quantum expertise within Singapore's defense organizations.
