= Cannon-launched guided projectile =

Precision-guided artillery munition

Cannon-launched guided projectiles (CLGP) are precision-guided munitions launched by howitzers, mortars, tank guns, and naval guns. Those projectile main propulsion system is the initial kinetic shoot, directed as much as possible toward the target. A secondary GPS or geocoordinates-based system then corrects the trajectory to increase target accuracy and fall closer to the target. This system relies on electronic guidance and pre-programmed coordinates, submitted to the round before its launch.

== Systems capable of firing CLGPs ==
- 120×570mm NATO
  - Arjun MBT – (India)
  - Merkava – (Israel)
- 120 mm mortar
  - PLL-05 – (China)
- 125 mm smoothbore ammunition
  - T-64 – (Soviet Union)
  - T-72 – (Soviet Union)
  - T-80 – (Soviet Union)
  - T-90 – (Soviet Union, Russia)
- 152 mm
  - M60A2 – (United States)
  - M551 Sheridan – (United States)
  - MBT-70 – (United States)
- 155 mm
  - Archer artillery system – (Sweden)

== List of CLGPs ==
=== Tank ===
- 105x617mm NATO
  - LAHAT – (Israel)
  - Falarick 105 – (Belgium/Ukraine)
- 120×570mm NATO
  - LAHAT – (Israel)
  - KSTAM – (South Korea)
  - SAMHO – (India) (planned to also support 125 mm smoothbore)
- 125 mm smoothbore ammunition
  - 9K112 Kobra – (Soviet Union)
  - 9M119 Svir/Refleks – (Soviet Union)
- 152 mm
  - MGM-51 Shillelagh – (United States)

=== Naval ===
- 5-inch, US naval (mainly Mark 45)
  - BTERM – (United States) (abandoned)
  - ERGM – (United States) (cancelled)
  - Excalibur N5
- 155 mm Advanced Gun System – (United States)
  - LRLAP – (United States) (abandoned)
- 8"/55 caliber Mark 71 gun)
  - SAM-N-8 Zeus – (United States) (abandoned)

=== Howitzer ===
- 122 mm
  - Kitolov-2M – (Russia) (also in a 120 mm mortar version)
- 152 mm
  - Krasnopol (Weapon) – (Russia, Soviet Union) semi-automatic laser-guided (also in 155 mm for export)
- 155 mm
  - M1156 precision guidance kit – (United States)
  - M712 Copperhead – (United States)
  - M982 Excalibur – (United States, Sweden)
  - Basir – (Iran)
  - BONUS – (Sweden, France)
  - SMArt 155 – (Germany)
  - Rheinmetall Denel Munitions 155 mm V-LAP
  - GP1 (Chinese Krasnopol clone)
  - GP6 (Improved GP1)

=== Mortar ===
- 81 mm mortar
  - Merlin mortar round – millimetric radar guided
- 120 mm mortar
  - XM395 precision guided mortar munition – (United States)
  - Strix mortar round – (Sweden)
  - KM-8 Gran – (Russia) guided 120 mm artillery shell with Malakhit fire control system.
  - GP120 (GP4) is a Chinese terminal corrected 120 mm mortar shell.
  - GP140 (GP9) is a Chinese semi-active laser (SAL) guidance 120 mm mortar shell.

== See also ==
- Missile tank
- Pereh
