= Precision-guided munition =

"Smart bombs", used to strike targets precisely

An Afghan Air Force GBU-58 guided bomb strikes a Taliban compound in Farah Province, Afghanistan on March 22, 2018.

A precision-guided munition (PGM), also called a smart weapon, smart munition, or smart bomb, is a type of weapon system that integrates advanced guidance and control systems, such as GPS, laser guidance, or infrared sensors, with various types of munitions, typically missiles or artillery shells, to allow for high-accuracy strikes against designated targets. PGMs are designed to precisely hit a predetermined target, typically with a margin of error (or circular error probable, CEP) that is far smaller than conventional unguided munitions. Unlike unguided munitions, PGMs use active or passive control mechanisms capable of steering the weapon towards its intended target. PGMs are capable of mid-flight course corrections, allowing them to adjust and hit the intended target even if conditions change. PGMs can be deployed from various platforms, including aircraft, naval ships, ground vehicles, ground-based launchers, and UAVs.

PGMs are primarily used in military operations to achieve greater accuracy, particularly in complex or sensitive environments, to reduce the risk to operators, lessen civilian harm, and minimize collateral damage. PGMs are considered an element of modern warfare to reduce unintended damage and civilian casualties. It is widely accepted that PGMs significantly outperform unguided weapons, particularly against fortified or mobile targets. During the Persian Gulf War, guided munitions accounted for only 9% of weapons fired but accounted for 75% of all successful hits. Despite guided weapons generally being used on more difficult targets, they were still 35 times more likely to destroy their targets per weapon dropped.

Because the damage effects of explosive weapons decrease with distance due to an inverse cube law, even modest improvements in accuracy (hence reduction in miss distance) enable a target to be attacked with fewer or smaller bombs. Thus, even if some guided bombs miss, fewer air crews are put at risk and the harm to civilians and the amount of collateral damage may be reduced. (Note: "During Russia's participation in the Syrian Civil War, only one of its aircraft, the Su-34 fighter-bomber, regularly used precision-guided munitions, Bronk explained, and even that aircraft often used unguided bombs and rockets.".) (Note: Connectivity to GLONASS may be a factor in the lack of Russian PGM availability, and the use of 3G/4G cell towers for Russian encrypted communications (Era) during the 2022 Russian invasion of Ukraine. This weakness was unearthed during the use of open communication ("Russian commanders are sometimes piggybacking on Ukrainian cell phone networks to communicate") when FSB was discussing the deaths of their general: Andrei Sukhovetsky, killed 28 Feb 2022.) The advent of precision-guided munitions resulted in the renaming of older, low-technology bombs as "unguided bombs," "dumb bombs," or "iron bombs." Some challenges of precision-guided munitions include high development and production costs and the reliance of PGMs on advanced technologies like GPS make them vulnerable to electronic warfare and cyberattacks.

== Types ==
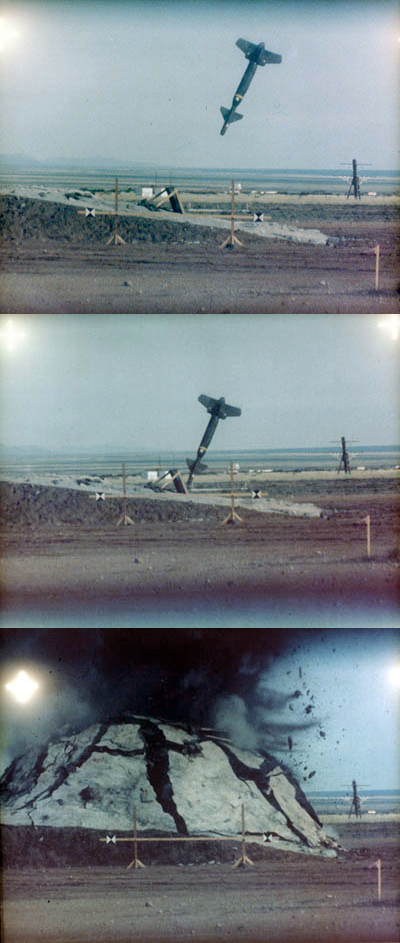
A laser-guided GBU-24 (BLU-109 warhead variant) strikes its target.

Recognizing the difficulty of hitting moving ships during the Spanish Civil War, the Germans were first to develop steerable munitions, using radio control or wire guidance. The U.S. tested TV-guided (GB-4), semi-active radar-guided (Bat), and infrared-guided (Felix) weapons.

=== Radio-controlled ===
The Germans were first to introduce PGMs in combat, with KG 100 deploying the 3,100 lb (1,400 kg) MCLOS-guidance Fritz X armored glide bomb, guided by the Kehl-Straßburg radio guidance system, to successfully attack the Italian battleship Roma in 1943, and the similarly Kehl-Straßburg MCLOS-guided Henschel Hs 293 rocket-boosted glide bomb (also in use since 1943, but only against lightly armored or unarmored ship targets).

The closest Allied equivalents, both unpowered designs, were the 1,000 lb (450 kg) VB-1 AZON (from "AZimuth ONly" control), used in both Europe and the CBI theater, and the US Navy's Bat, primarily used in the Pacific Theater of World War II — the Navy's Bat was more advanced than either German PGM ordnance design or the USAAF's VB-1 AZON, in that it had its own on board, autonomous radar seeker system to direct it to a target. In addition, the U.S. tested the rocket-propelled Gargoyle, which never entered service. Japanese PGMs — with the exception of the anti-ship air-launched, rocket-powered, human-piloted Yokosuka MXY-7 Ohka, "Kamikaze" flying bomb did not see combat in World War II.

Prior to the war, the British experimented with radio-controlled remotely guided planes laden with explosives, such as Larynx. The United States Army Air Forces used similar techniques with Operation Aphrodite, but had few successes; the German Mistel (Mistletoe) "parasite aircraft" was no more effective, guided by the human pilot flying the single-engined fighter mounted above the unmanned, explosive-laden twin-engined "flying bomb" below it, released in the Mistel's attack dive from the fighter.

The U.S. programs restarted in the Korean War. In the 1960s, the electro-optical bomb (or camera bomb) was reintroduced. They were equipped with television cameras and flare sights, by which the bomb would be steered until the flare superimposed the target. The camera bombs transmitted a "bomb's eye view" of the target back to a controlling aircraft. An operator in this aircraft then transmitted control signals to steerable fins fitted to the bomb. Such weapons were used increasingly by the USAF in the last few years of the Vietnam War because the political climate was increasingly intolerant of civilian casualties, and because it was possible to strike difficult targets (such as bridges) effectively with a single mission; the Thanh Hoa Bridge, for instance, was attacked repeatedly with iron bombs, to no effect, only to be dropped in one mission with PGMs.

Although not as popular as the newer JDAM and JSOW weapons, or even the older laser-guided bomb systems, weapons like the AGM-62 Walleye TV guided bomb are still being used, in conjunction with the AAW-144 Data Link Pod, on US Navy F/A-18 Hornets.

=== Infrared-guided/electro-optical ===
In World War II, the U.S. National Defense Research Committee developed the VB-6 Felix, which used infrared to home on ships. While it entered production in 1945, it was never employed operationally. Around the same time, development was also underway in Germany and Japan, but it remained at the experimental stage. The first successful electro-optical guided munition was the AGM-62 Walleye during the Vietnam war. It was a family of large glide bombs which could automatically track targets using contrast differences in the video feed. The original concept was created by engineer Norman Kay while tinkering with televisions as a hobby. It was based on a device which could track objects on a television screen and place a "blip" on them to indicate where it was aiming. The first test of the weapon on 29 January 1963 was a success, with the weapon making a direct hit on the target. It served successfully for three decades until the 1990s.

The Raytheon Maverick is the most common electro-optical guided missile. As a heavy anti-tank missile it has among its various marks guidance systems such as electro-optical (AGM-65A), imaging infrared (AGM-65D), and laser homing (AGM-65E). The first two, by guiding themselves based on the visual or IR scene of the target, are fire-and-forget in that the pilot can release the weapon and it will guide itself to the target without further input, which allows the delivery aircraft to manoeuvre to escape return fire. The Pakistani NESCOM H-2 MUPSOW and H-4 MUPSOW is an electro-optical (IR imaging and television guided) is a drop and forget precision-guided glide bomb. The Israeli Elbit Opher is also an IR imaging "drop and forget" guided bomb that has been reported to be considerably cheaper than laser-homing bombs and can be used by any aircraft, not requiring specialized wiring for a laser designator or for another aircraft to illuminate the target. During NATO's air campaign in 1999 in Kosovo the new Italian AF AMX employed the Opher.

=== Laser-guided ===
In 1962, the US Army began research into laser guidance systems and by 1967 the USAF had conducted a competitive evaluation leading to full development of the world's first laser-guided bomb, the BOLT-117, in 1968. All such bombs work in much the same way, relying on the target being illuminated, or "painted," by a laser target designator on the ground or on an aircraft. They have the significant disadvantage of not being usable in poor weather where the target illumination cannot be seen, or where a target designator cannot get near the target. The laser designator sends its beam in a coded series of pulses so the bomb cannot be confused by an ordinary laser, and also so multiple designators can operate in reasonable proximity.

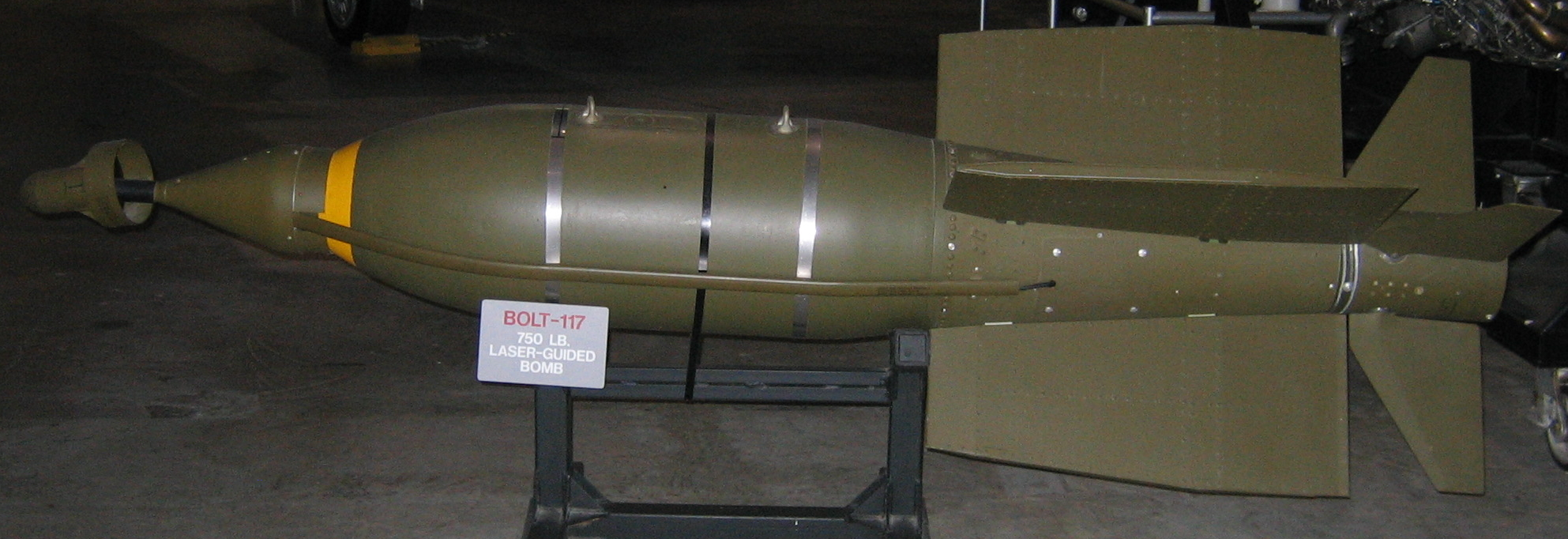
BOLT-117, the world's first laser-guided bomb

Originally the project began as a surface to air missile seeker developed by Texas Instruments. When Texas Instruments executive Glenn E. Penisten attempted to sell the new technology to the Air Force they inquired if it could instead be used as a ground attack system to overcome problems they were having with accuracy of bombing in Vietnam. After 6 attempts the weapon improved accuracy from 148 to 10 ft (50 to 3 m) and greatly exceeded the design requirements. The system was sent to Vietnam and performed well. Without the existence of targeting pods they had to be aimed using a hand held laser from the back seat of an F-4 Phantom aircraft, but still performed well. Eventually over 28,000 were dropped during the war.

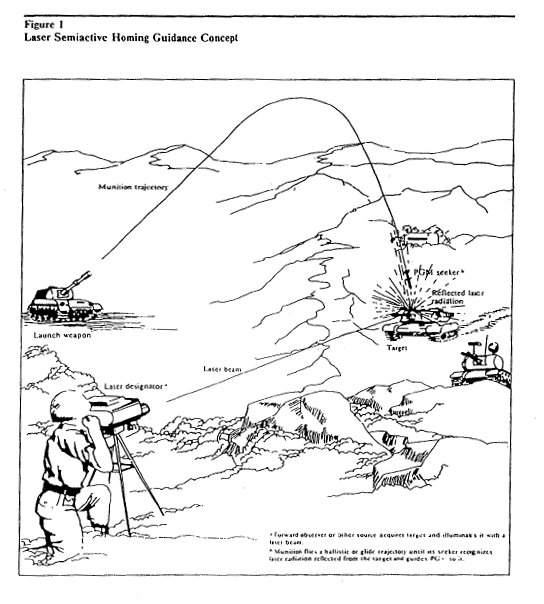
Diagram showing the operation of a laser-guided ammunition round. From a CIA report, 1986.

Laser-guided weapons did not become commonplace until the advent of the microchip. They made their practical debut in Vietnam, where on 13 May 1972 they were used in the second successful attack on the Thanh Hóa Bridge ("Dragon's Jaw"). This structure had previously been the target of 800 American sorties (using unguided weapons) and was partially destroyed in each of two successful attacks, the other being on 27 April 1972 using AGM-62 Walleyes.

They were used, though not on a large scale, by the British forces during the 1982 Falklands War. The first large-scale use of smart weapons came in the early 1990s during Operation Desert Storm when they were used by coalition forces against Iraq. Even so, most of the air-dropped ordnance used in that war was "dumb," although the percentages are biased by the large use of various (unguided) cluster bombs. Laser-guided weapons were used in large numbers during the 1999 Kosovo War, but their effectiveness was often reduced by the poor weather conditions prevalent in the southern Balkans.

- Paveway is a series of laser-guided bombs made in the United States. Paveway II 500 lb (230 kg) LGBs (such as GBU-12) are a cheaper lightweight precision-guided munition (PGM) suitable for use against vehicles and other small targets, while a Paveway III 2,000 lb (910 kg) penetrator (such as GBU-24) is a more expensive weapon with improved aerodynamic efficiency suitable for use against high-value targets. GBU-12s were used to great effect in the first Gulf War, dropped from F-111F aircraft to destroy Iraqi armored vehicles in a process informally referred to by pilots as "tank plinking."
- AGM-123 Skipper II was a short-range laser-guided missile developed by the United States Navy. The Skipper was intended as an anti-ship weapon, capable of disabling the largest vessels with a 1,000 lb (450 kg) impact-fuzed warhead. It was composed of a Mark 83 bomb fitted with a Paveway guidance kit and two Mk 78 solid propellant rockets that fire upon launch.
- Some of the most commonly used laser-guided bombs are the family of GBU-54, GBU-55, and GBU-56 Joint Direct Attack Munitions, or "Laser JDAMs" (LJDAMs), which add a laser seeker to the nose of a JDAM-equipped bomb, enabling it to engage moving targets. The laser seeker is a cooperative development between Boeing's Defense, Space and Security unit and Israel's Elbit Systems.
- Sudarshan is an Indian laser-guided bomb kit, developed by Aeronautical Development Establishment (ADE), a DRDO lab with technological support from another DRDO lab Instruments Research and Development Establishment (IRDE), for the Indian Air Force (IAF).
- KAB-1500L and KAB-500L are Russian laser-guided bombs.
- LT PGB is a family of Chinese laser-guided munitions.
- LS PGB is a family of Chinese GPS+INS or laser guided munitions.
- The Advanced Precision Kill Weapon System (APKWS) also known as Laser, infrared Guided Rocket (LiGR) is a design conversion of Hydra 70 unguided rockets with a laser guidance kit to turn them into precision-guided munitions (PGMs).
- Ugroza (Russian: Угроза, meaning "menace") is a precision-guided weapons system made in Russian Federation. It is an upgrade for standard Russian "dumb" rockets, including the S-5, S-8, and S-13 rockets. The system upgrades the "dumb" rockets with laser guidance, very significantly increasing their accuracy. It requires a laser target designator, from either an airborne or land based source, to "paint" a target.
- The Roketsan Cirit is a Turkish semi-active laser laser guided missile.
- The Griffin Laser Guided Bomb (Griffin LGB) is a laser-guided bomb system made by Israel Aerospace Industries' MBT missile division. It is an add-on kit which is used to retrofit existing Mark 82, Mark 83, and Mark 84 and other "dumb fire" gravity bombs, making them into laser-guided smart bombs (with the option of GPS guidance). Initial development completed in 1990.

=== Radar-guided ===
The Lockheed-Martin Hellfire II lightweight anti-tank weapon in one mark uses the radar on the Boeing AH-64D Apache Longbow to provide fire-and-forget guidance for that weapon.

=== Satellite-guided ===
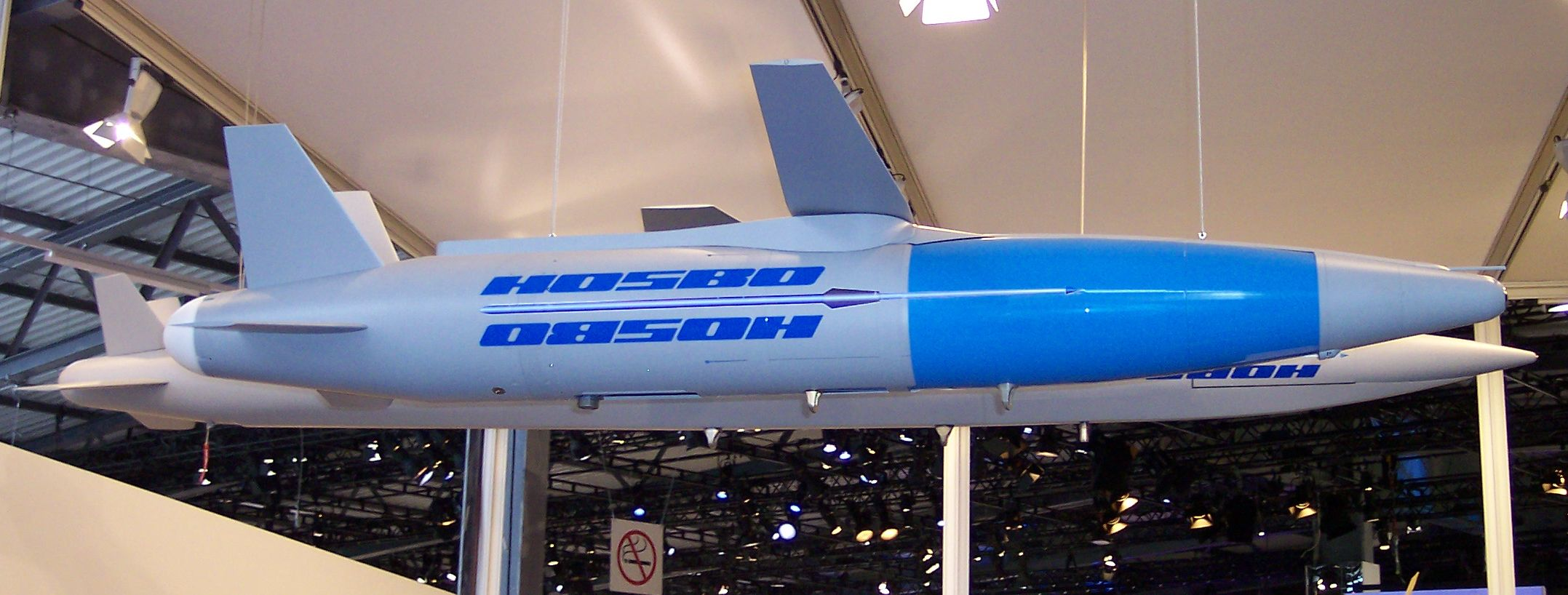
HOPE/HOSBO of the Luftwaffe with a combination of GPS/INS and electro-optical guidance

Lessons learned during the first Gulf War showed the value of precision munitions, yet they also highlighted the difficulties in employing them—specifically when visibility of the ground or target from the air was degraded. The problem of poor visibility does not affect satellite-guided weapons such as Joint Direct Attack Munition (JDAM) and Joint Stand-Off Weapon (JSOW), which make use of the United States' GPS system for guidance. This weapon can be employed in all weather conditions, without any need for ground support. Because it is possible to jam GPS, the guidance package reverts to inertial navigation in the event of GPS signal loss. Inertial navigation is significantly less accurate; the JDAM achieves a published Circular Error Probable (CEP) of 43 ft (13 m) under GPS guidance, but typically only 98 ft (30 m) under inertial guidance (with free fall times of 100 seconds or less).

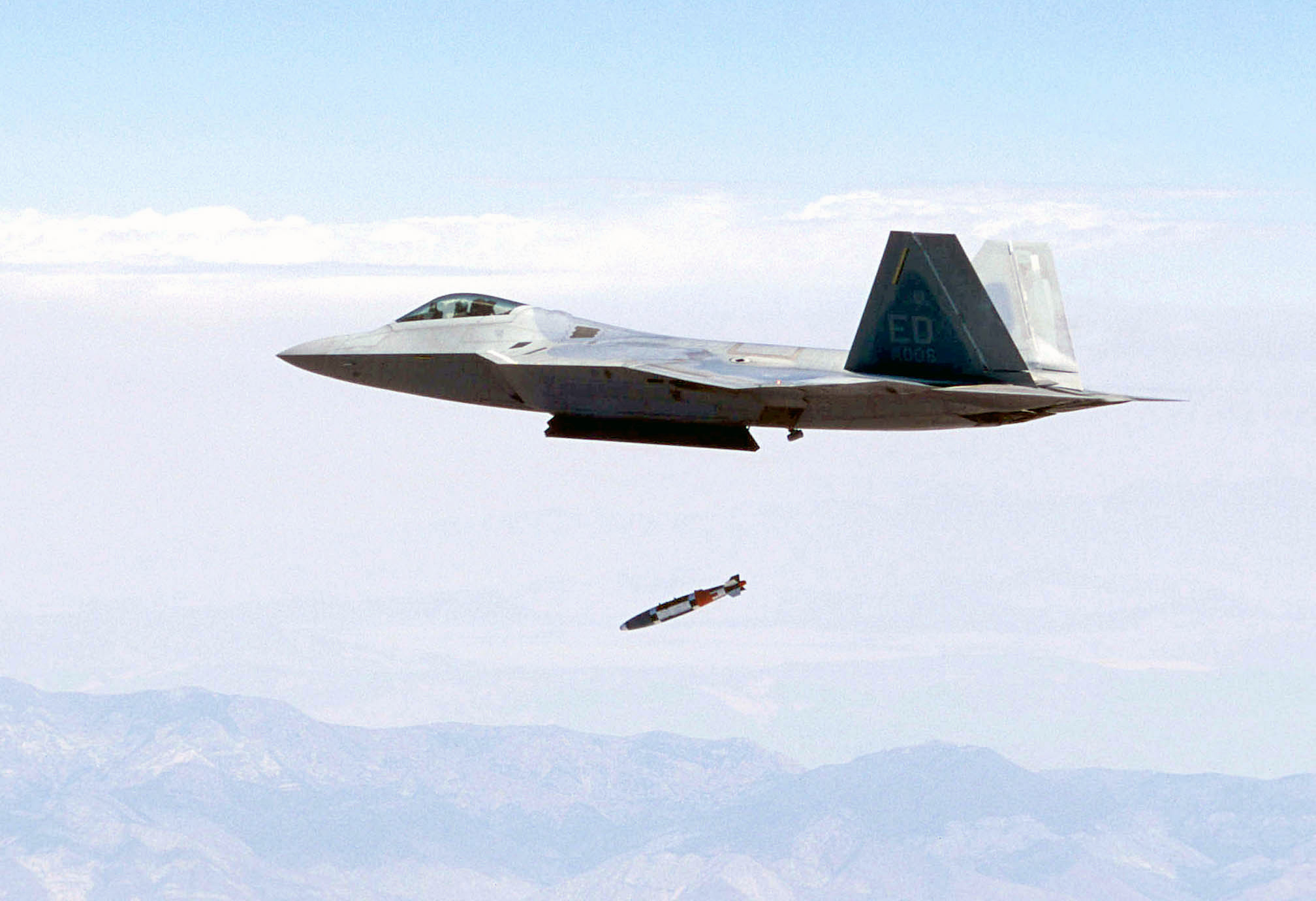
A F-22 releases a JDAM from its center internal bay while flying at supersonic speed.

- The High Speed Low Drag Bomb is a series precision-guided munition used by Indian Air Force. It has 450 kg (990 lb) and 500 kg (1,100 lb) variants. They use Inertial Navigation System and GPS/NavIC satellite guidance in mid-course and semi-active laser homing for Terminal guidance.
- Wind Corrected Munitions Dispenser (WCMD) is a GPS/INS-guided US tail kit for use with the TMD (Tactical Munitions Dispenser) family of cluster bombs to convert them to precision-guided munitions.
- The CBU-107 Passive Attack Weapon is an air-dropped guided bomb consisting of a variant Wind Corrected Munitions Dispenser containing metal penetrator rods of various sizes. It was designed to attack targets where an explosive effect may be undesirable, such as fuel storage tanks or chemical weapon stockpiles in civilian areas.
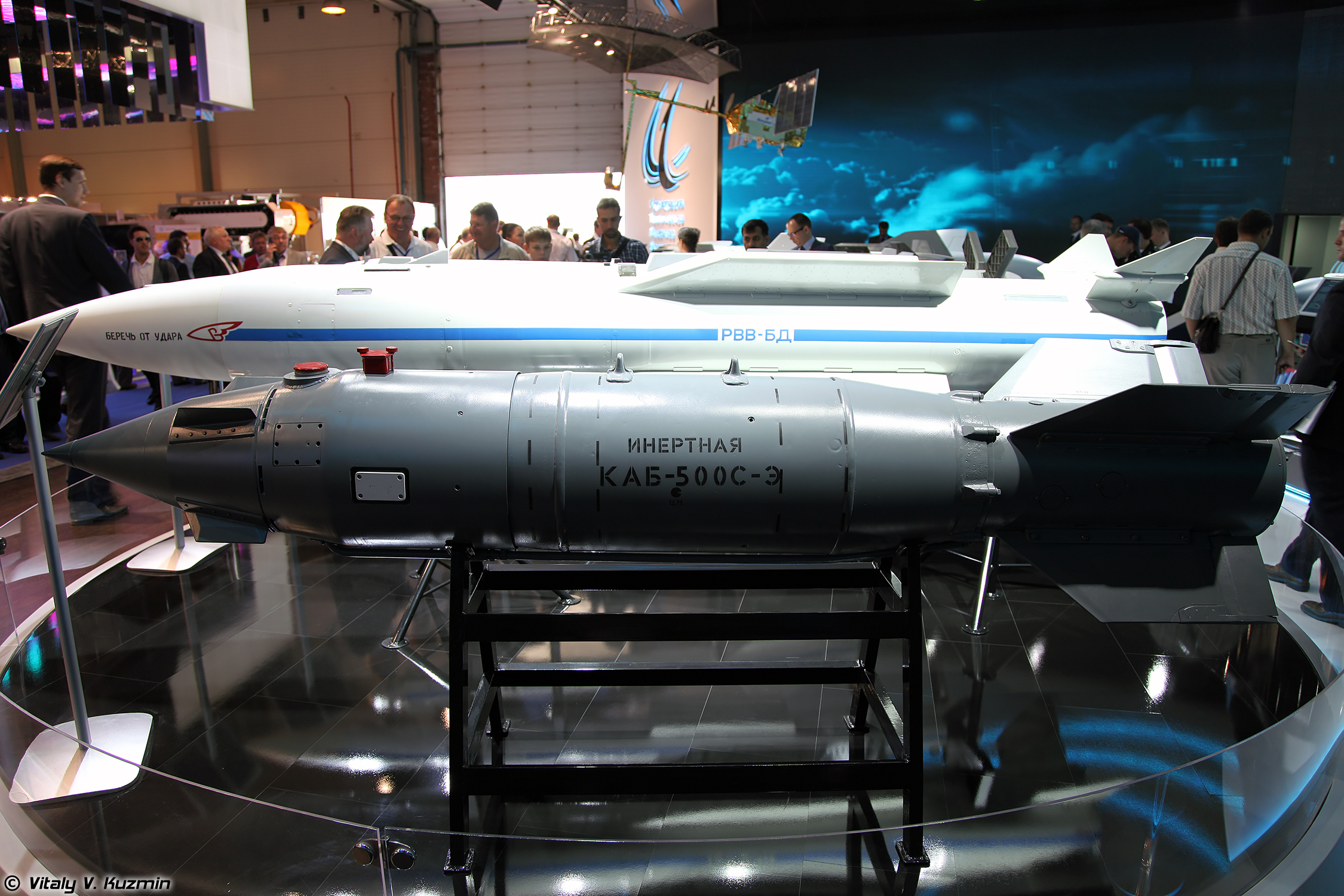
  KAB-500S-E. Russian GLONASS-Guided Bomb
- The GBU-57A/B Massive Ordnance Penetrator (MOP) is a U.S. Air Force, precision-guided, 30,000-pound (14,000 kg) "bunker buster" bomb. This is substantially larger than the deepest penetrating bunker busters previously available, the 5,000-pound (2,300 kg) GBU-28 and GBU-37.
- The SMKB (Smart-MK-Bomb) is a Brazilian guidance kit that turns a standard 500-pound (230 kg) Mk 82 or 1,000-pound (450 kg) Mk 83 into a precision-guided weapon, respectively called SMKB-82 and SMKB-83. The kit provides extended range up to 31 mi (50 km) and are guided by an integrated inertial guidance system coupled to three satellites networks (GPS, Galileo and GLONASS), relying on wireless to handle the flow of data between the aircraft and the munition.
- FT PGB is a family of Chinese satellite and Inertial, guided munitions.
- LS PGB is a family of Chinese GPS+INS or laser guided munitions.

The precision of these weapons is dependent both on the precision of the measurement system used for location determination and the precision in setting the coordinates of the target. The latter critically depends on intelligence information, not all of which is accurate. According to a CIA report, the accidental United States bombing of the Chinese embassy in Belgrade during Operation Allied Force by NATO aircraft was attributed to faulty target information. However, if the targeting information is accurate, satellite-guided weapons are significantly more likely to achieve a successful strike in any given weather conditions than any other type of precision-guided munition.

=== Advanced guidance concepts ===
Responding to after-action reports from pilots who employed laser or satellite guided weapons, Boeing developed a Laser JDAM (LJDAM) to provide both types of guidance in a single kit. Based on the existing Joint Direct Attack Munition configurations, a laser guidance package is added to a GPS/INS-guided weapon to increase its overall accuracy. Raytheon has developed the Enhanced Paveway family, which adds GPS/INS guidance to their Paveway family of laser-guidance packages. These "hybrid" laser and GPS guided weapons permit the carriage of fewer weapons types, while retaining mission flexibility, because these weapons can be employed equally against moving and fixed targets, or targets of opportunity. For instance, a typical weapons load on an F-16 flying in the Iraq War included a single 2,000-pound (910 kg) JDAM and two 1,000-pound (450 kg) LGBs. With LJDAM, and the new GBU-39 Small Diameter Bomb (SDB), these same aircraft can carry more bombs if necessary, and have the option of satellite or laser guidance for each weapon release.

- Spice (munition) is an Israeli EO/GPS-guided guidance kit for converting air-droppable unguided bombs into precision guided bombs. Spice can be preprogrammed, with up to 100 different targets it may have to engage during a mission. The one target it will actually engage may then be selected, inflight, by an aircrewman.
- The HGK guidance kit (HGK), Turkish: Hassas Güdüm Kiti / Precision Guidance Kit, developed by TÜBİTAK-SAGE, is a GPS/INS guidance kit that converts 2,000-pound (910 kg) Mark 84 bombs into smart weapons. It enables precision strike capability in all weather conditions with long range at a dispersion of 20 ft (6 m).
- Armement Air-Sol Modulaire (AASM), developed by Safran Electronics & Defense, comprises a frontal guidance kit and a rear-mounted range extension kit matched to a dumb bomb. The weapon is modular because it can integrate different types of guidance units and different types of bombs. It uses hybrid inertial navigation system (INS) / Global Positioning System (GPS) guidance. Other variants add infrared homing or laser guidance to increase accuracy.
- Paveway IV is a dual mode GPS/INS and laser-guided bomb manufactured by Raytheon UK (formerly Raytheon Systems Limited). It is the latest iteration of the Paveway series.
- Denel Dynamics Umbani a precision-guided bomb kit manufactured by Denel Dynamics in South Africa. It consists of a number of modules fitted to NATO standard Mk81, Mk82 or Mk83 low drag free-fall bombs to convert them to glide bombs.
- Smart Anti-Airfield Weapon (SAAW) is an Indian precision-guided Anti-Airfield Weapon developed by Research Centre Imarat with a range up to 62 mi (100 km). It employs inertial and satellite navigation with electro-optical, imaging infrared sensor.
- High Speed Low Drag Bomb (HSLD) is an Indian precision guided munition developed by Armament Research and Development Establishment that is comparable with the US' Mark 80 series. It uses inertial and satellite navigation with laser guidance kit for target accuracy.
- Moving Target Artillery Round (MTAR)

The U.S. Navy leads development for a new 155 mm (6.1 in) artillery round called Moving Target Artillery Round, capable of destroying moving targets in GPS-denied environments". The Office of Naval Research (ONR), the Naval Surface Warfare Center Dahlgren Division (NSWC Dahlgren), and the U.S. Army Research Laboratory (ARL) have been coordinating MTAR, with final development scheduled for 2019.
Key features of the MTAR shell include extended range against moving targets, precision guidance and navigation without GPS, subsystem modularity, subsystem maturity, weapon system compatibility, restricted altitude, all-weather capability, reduced time of flight, and affordability. The new munition is intended for the Army or Marine Corps M777A1 howitzer, the M109A6 Paladin, and M109A7 Paladin Integrated Management (PIM) self-propelled 155 mm (6.1 in) artillery systems. The shell also would be for the Navy's Advanced Gun System (AGS) aboard the Zumwalt-class destroyer, and other future naval gun systems.

- Precision Guidance Kit – Modernization (PGK-M)

The U.S. Army is planning for GPS-denied environments with the new Precision Guidance Kit – Modernization (PGK-M). An enhancement of previous technologies, PGK-M will give U.S. forces the ability to continue launching precision strikes when GPS is compromised by the enemy.
Picatinny Arsenal engineers are leading the development of a GPS alternative using image navigation for precision guidance of munitions, under the Armament Research, Development and Engineering Center (ARDEC). Other research partners include Draper Labs, U.S. Army Research Laboratory, Air Force Research Laboratory and the Aviation and Missile Research, Development, and Engineering Center.
The enhanced munition can navigate to a desired location, through a reference image used by the technology to reach the target. The PGK-M includes a collection of ad hoc software programmable radio networks, various kinds of wave-relay connectivity technologies and navigational technology.

- PBK-500U Drel is a Russian guided jamming-resistant stealth glide bomb.

=== Cannon and mortar-launched guided projectiles ===
A cannon-launched guided projectile (CLGP), is fired from artillery, ship's cannon, or armored vehicles. Several agencies and organizations sponsored the CLGP programs. The United States Navy sponsored the Deadeye program, a laser-guided shell for its 5 in (127 mm) guns and a program to mate a Paveway guidance system to an 8 in (203 mm) shell for the 8"/55 caliber Mark 71 gun in the 1970s. Other Navy efforts include the BTERM, ERGM, and LRLAP shells.

- The U.S. Army's MGM-51 Shillelagh missile can be considered a type of CLGP. Intended for use on the M551 Sheridan light tank, the Shillelagh missile was fired out of the Sheridan's cannon to provide robust anti-tank capability. The Army's M712 Copperhead laser guided artillery round was used in Desert Storm. Army CLGPs include the M982 Excalibur 155 mm (6.1 in) artillery shell, the XM395 Precision Guided Mortar Munition, and the XM1156 Precision Guidance Kit to refit existing 155 mm shells with precision guidance, as the Air Force's JDAM program converts dumb bombs into precision munitions.
- M982 Excalibur, GPS-guided munitions (XM982) for 155 mm artillery was developed in a collaborative effort between U.S. Army Research Laboratory (ARL) and the Armaments Research and Development Center (ARDEC). Research included developing GPS and micro-electromechanical systems (MEMS) Inertial Sensor Technology. Excalibur was fielded in Operation Iraqi Freedom in the summer of 2007. Technology developed on the Excalibur is also applied in the Army's Precision Guidance Kit (PGK) for use on existing conventional projectiles and the Mortar Guidance Kit (MGK) for use on conventional mortars.
- XM1111 Mid-Range Munition is cancelled 120 mm (4.7 in) tank gun launched missile.
- LAHAT is Israeli semi-active laser homing guided low-weight anti-tank guided missile that can be launched from smoothbore tank guns.
- KSTAM is South Korean guided munition shot from the gun of K2 Black Panther tank.
- 30F39 Krasnopol is a Russian 152 / 155 mm (6.0 / 6.1 in) cannon-launched, fin-stabilized, base bleed-assisted, semi-automatic laser-guided, explosive projectile. It automatically 'homes' on a point illuminated by a laser designator, typically operated by a ground-based artillery observer.
- Kitolov-2M is a Russian laser-guided 120 / 122 mm (4.7 / 4.8 in) artillery shell with Malakhit automated artillery fire control system.
- 9M119 Svir/Refleks are Russian tank gun-launched laser-guided projectiles.
- Pansarsprängvinggranat m/94 STRIX is a Swedish endphase-guided projectile fired from a 120 mm (4.7 in) mortar currently manufactured by Saab Bofors Dynamics.

STRIX is fired like a conventional mortar round. The round contains an infrared imaging sensor that it uses to guide itself onto any tank or armoured fighting vehicle in the vicinity where it lands. The seeker is designed to ignore targets that are already burning.

- Basir is an Iranian artillery fired laser-guided, 155 mm explosive projectile designed to destroy enemy tanks, vehicles and other moving or non-moving targets with high precision. This weapon is similar in function with Russian Kransnopol or American M712 Copperhead.
- SMArt 155 is a German 155 mm artillery round, designed for a long range, indirect fire top attack role against armoured vehicles. The SMArt carrier shell contains two submunitions with infrared sensor and millimeter wave radar, which descend over the battlefield on ballutes and attack hardened targets with explosively formed penetrator warheads. Built with multiple redundant self-destruct mechanisms, these submunitions were specifically designed to fall outside the category of submunition weapons prohibited by the 2008 Convention on Cluster Munitions.
- SAMHO is an Indian gun-launched anti-tank guided missile developed by the Armament Research and Development Establishment for the Arjun MBT.
- Rheinmetall Denel Munitions 155 mm V-LAP
- GP1: Chinese laser-guided 155 mm artillery projectile based on Krasnopol.
- GP6: Chinese laser-guided 155 mm artillery projectile based on Krasnopol.
- XM395 Precision Guided Mortar Munition
- KM-8 Gran is a Russian guided 120 mm mortar shell with Malakhit fire control system.
- GP120 (GP4) is a Chinese terminal corrected 120 mm mortar shell.
- GP140 is a Chinese semi-active laser (SAL) guided 120 mm mortar shell.

=== Guided small arms ===
Precision-guided small arms prototypes have been developed which use a laser designator to guide an electronically actuated bullet to a target. Another system in development uses a laser range finder to trigger an explosive small arms shell in proximity to a target. The U.S. Army plans to use such devices in the future.

In 2008 the EXACTO program began under DARPA to develop a "fire and forget" smart sniper rifle system including a guided smart bullet and improved scope. The exact technologies of this smart bullet have not been released. EXACTO was test fired in 2014 and 2015 and results showing the bullet altered course to correct its path to its target were released.

In 2012 Sandia National Laboratories announced a self-guided bullet prototype that could track a target illuminated with a laser designator. The bullet is capable of updating its position 30 times a second and hitting targets over a mile away.

In mid-2016, Russia revealed it was developing a similar "smart bullet" weapon designed to hit targets at a distance of up to 6 mi (10 km).

Pike is a precision-guided mini-missile fired from an underslung grenade launcher.

Air burst grenade launchers are a type of precision-guided weapons. Such grenade launchers can pre-program their grenades using a fire-control system to explode in the air above or beside the enemy.

== Recent advancements of PGMs ==
Multiple Mode Guidance Technologies

Precision-guided munitions (PGMs) with multiple mode guidance systems use multiple targeting technologies to enhance accuracy and adaptability. The multiple guidance systems merge long-range precision, mid-course correction, and final-phase strike accuracy using a combination of guidance technologies such as GPS, inertial navigation systems (INS), laser, infrared (IR), radar and artificial intelligence (AI). Multiple mode guidance systems address the limitations of single-mode guidance, such as adverse weather, challenging terrain, blocked GPS signals, and enemy countermeasures, to ensure effective operation. Their adaptability ensures that PGMs can still hit their target, even when one component of the system has been compromised. Types of guidance used in Multiple Mode Guidance System PGMs include Global Positioning System (GPS) that give precise geolocation and long-range targeting capabilities crucial for accurate initial targeting using external satellite signals, Inertial Navigation Systems (INS) that independently tracks the munition's position using gyroscopes and accelerometers, Laser Guidance using direct laser beam for target guidance, Infrared (IR) Guidance sensors that detect and track heat signatures (heat emitted by vehicles, people, or equipment), Radar Guidance for targeting and tracking and Artificial Intelligence (AI) for real-time sensor data analysis, target recognition, and decision-making.

== See also ==
- Airburst round
- Guidance system
- Guided bomb
- Glide bomb
- Missile guidance
- TERCOM
- Terminal guidance
- Wire-guided missile

== Notes ==
=== Bibliography ===
- Kutzscher, Edgar (1957). Benecke, T; Quick, A (eds.). History of German Guided Missiles Development. NATO https://web.archive.org/web/20260826094637/https://publications.sto.nato.int/publications/AGARD/AGARD-AG-20/AGARD-AG-20.pdf. Archived from the original (PDF) on 26 August 2026.
- Watts, Barry D. Six decades of guided munitions and battle networks: progress and prospects. Washington, DC: Center for Strategic and Budgetary Assessments, 2007.
- Blackwelder, Major Donald I. The long road to Desert Storm and beyond: the development of precision guided bombs. Tannenberg Publishing, 2015. ISBN 9781786256102
- Sayıl, Asaf, and Fuat Erden. "The history of guided bombs, guidance kits, wing kits, and wing deployment mechanisms: Güdümlü Bombaların, Güdüm Kitlerinin, Kanat Kitlerinin ve Kanat Açma Mekanizmalarının Tarihçesi." Journal of Aeronautics and Space Technologies 17.2 (2024): 203-234.
