= Top-attack =

Weapon designed to attack armoured vehicles from above

A top attack weapon is designed to attack armored vehicles from above, to take advantage of the fact that the armour is usually thinnest on the top of an armoured vehicle. The device may be delivered as a smart submunition or a primary munition by an anti-tank guided missile (ATGM), mortar bomb, artillery shell, or even an emplaced munition such as a mine. Top attack munitions use either a shaped charge warhead (often now tandem warheads in order to defeat ERA), or an explosively formed penetrator (EFP) warhead fired while over the target (usually by submunition).

The top attack concept was first put into service by the Swedish Armed Forces in 1988 with the Bofors RBS 56 BILL top-attack anti-tank missile.

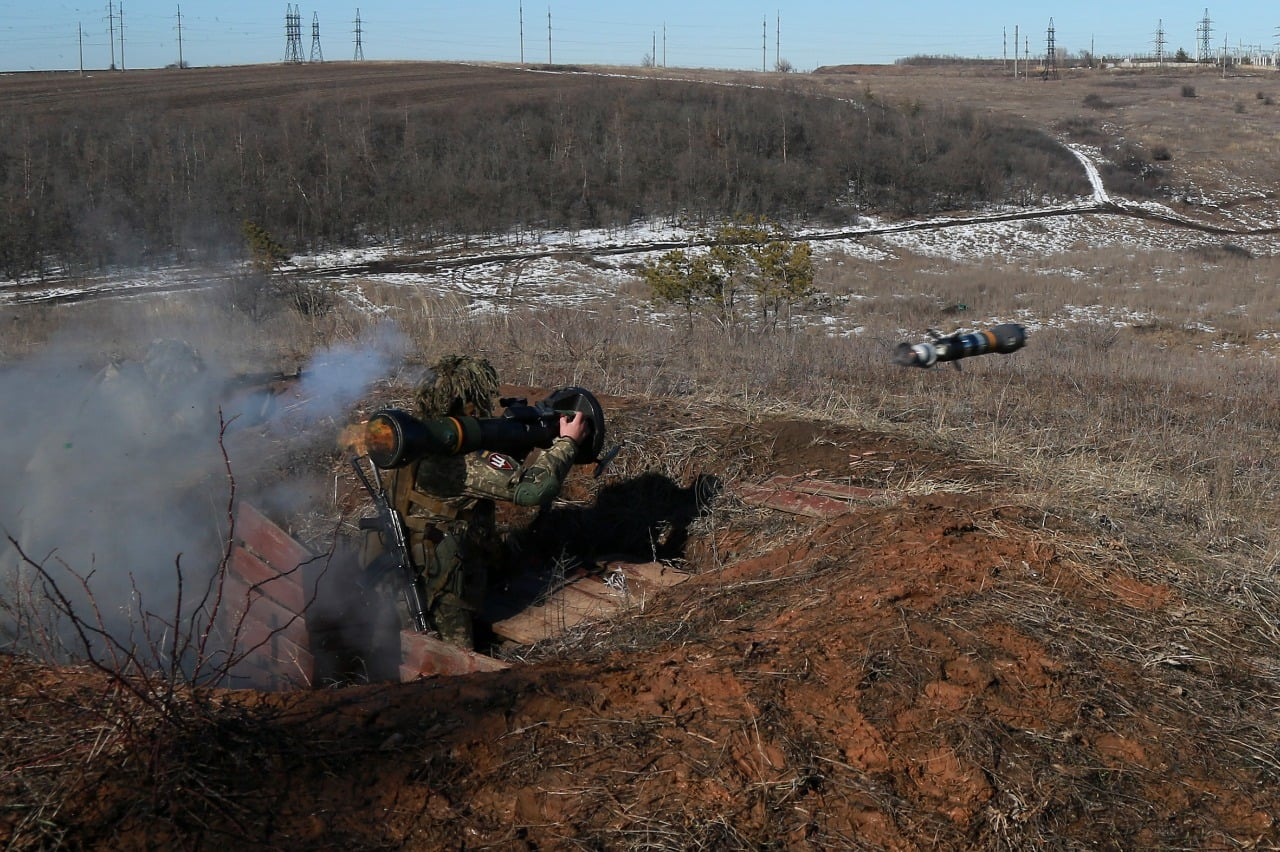
Ukrainian army soldiers fire the NLAW in training.

Another method of top attack is the overfly top-attack (OTA or OFTA) where a missile with a vertically oriented shaped charge jet that fires downwards. A missile is directed to overfly the vehicle where a sensor detects the vehicle, and detonates the shape charge down into the top of the vehicle. This is system employed with the NLAW man-portable ATGM.

== Weapon systems using top attack ==
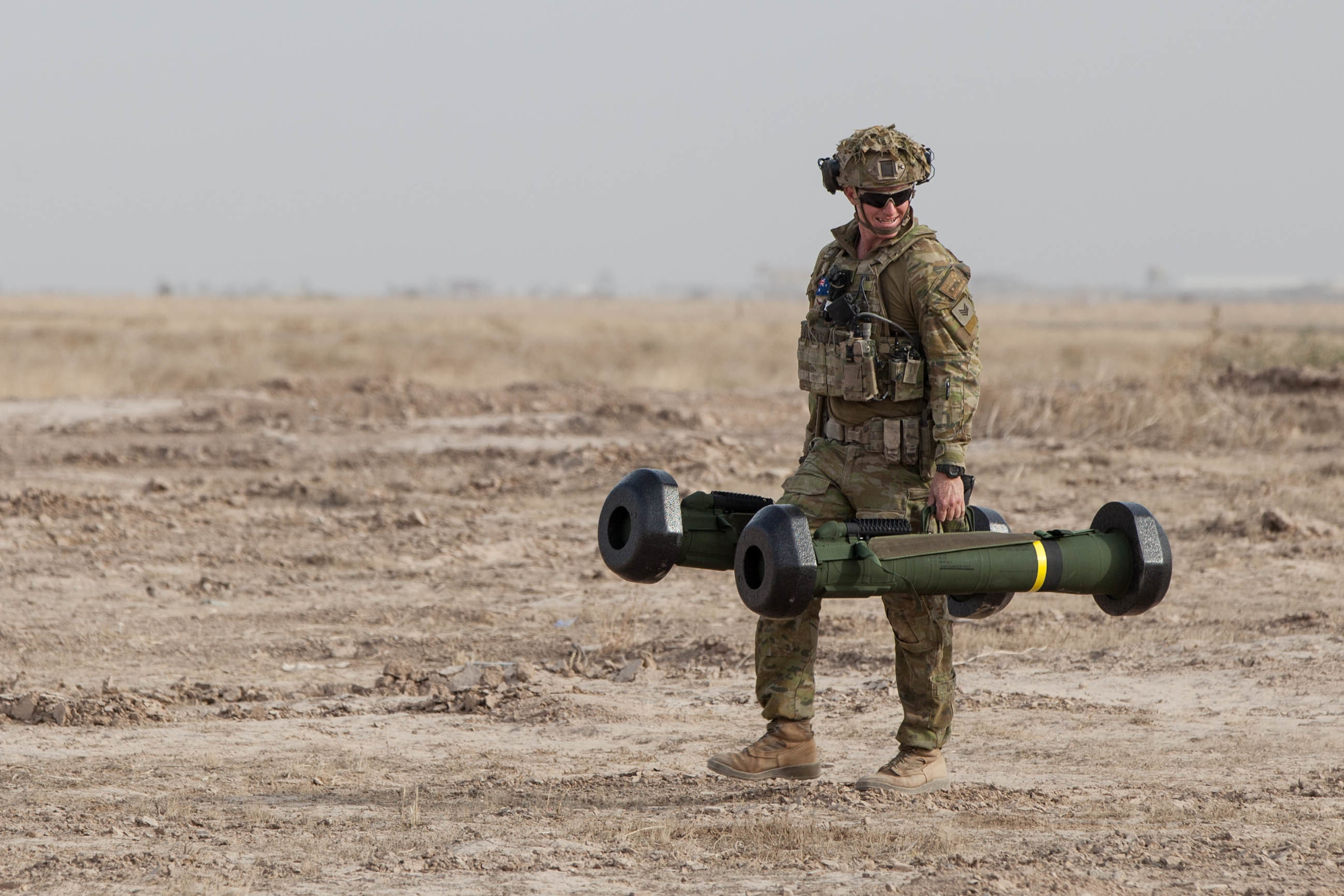
An Australian Army soldier carrying two FGM-148 Javelins at the Besmaya Range Complex in Iraq, October 2016

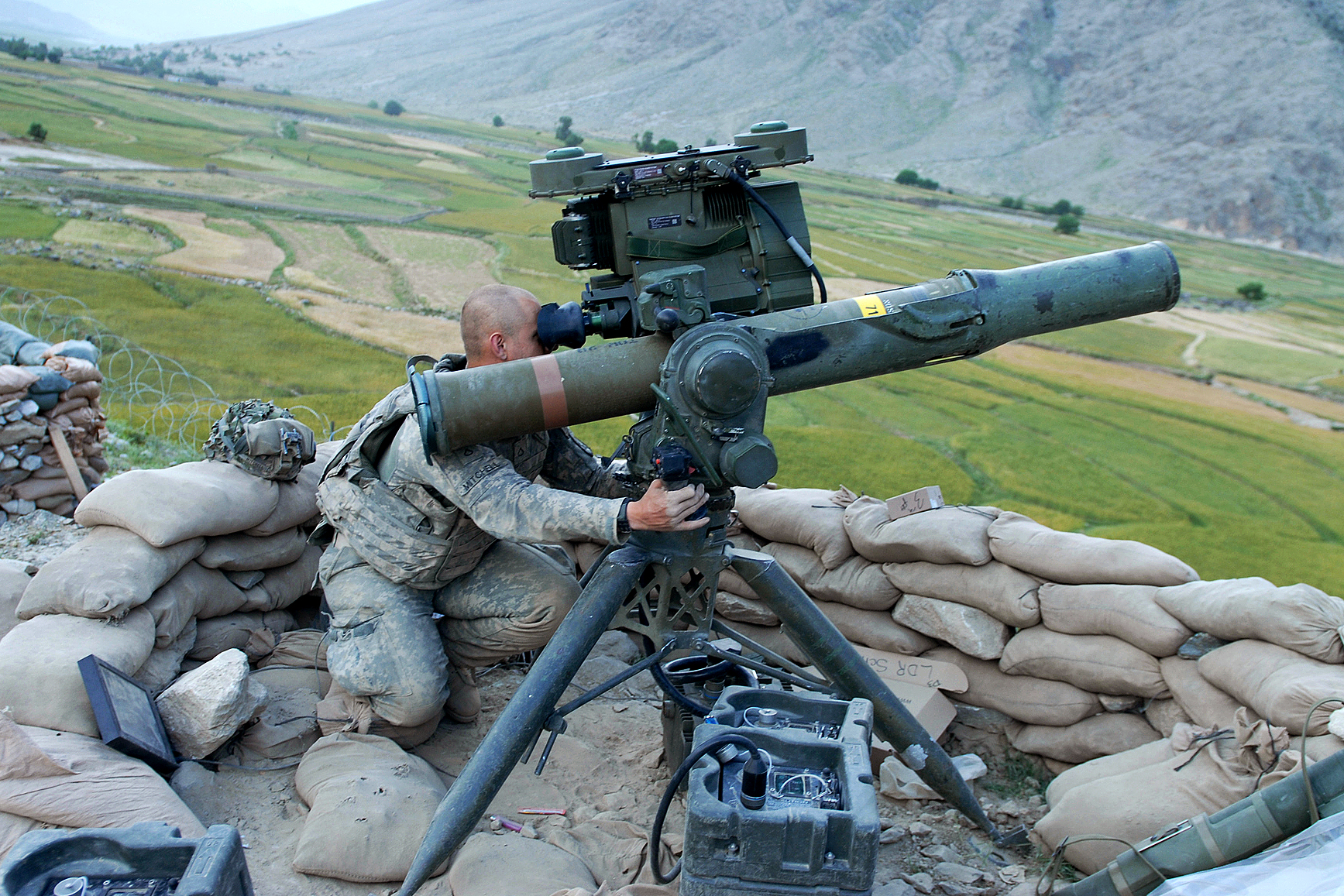
An M41 tripod-mounted TOW ITAS-FTL with PADS (a variant of the BGM-71 TOW) of the U.S. Army in Kunar Province, Afghanistan, May 2009

The firing phase of a SMArt 155 submunition. The submunition is held aloft by a parachute, while the submunition seeks a target and fires

Notable weapon systems that utilize top attack include:

Weapon system	Type	Country of origin
AGM-114 Hellfire	air-to-ground ATGM	United States
AT-1K Raybolt	man-portable ATGM	South Korea
BGM-71F/TOW-2B	ATGM	United States
Bofors/Nexter Bonus	artillery shell submunition	Sweden / France
BLU-108	aerial bomb	United States
CBU-97 Sensor Fuzed Weapon	aerial Cluster bomb	United States
FGM-148 Javelin	man-portable ATGM	United States
Griffin LGB	Laser-guided bomb (kit)	Israel
HJ-12	man-portable ATGM	China
Kitolov-2M	Mortar & Artillery	Russian Federation
KM-8 Gran	mortar	Russian Federation
Krasnopol	artillery	Soviet Union / Russian Federation
KSTAM	gun-launched guided projectile	South Korea
LAHAT	semi-active laser ATGM	Israel
M93 Hornet mine	anti-vehicle wide-area mine	United States
Mokopa	air-to-ground ATGM	South Africa
MPATGM	man-portable ATGM	India
Nag	ATGM	India
NLAW	overfly top-attack ATGM	Sweden / United Kingdom
OMTAS	man-portable ATGM	Turkey
PARS 3 LR	air-to-ground ATGM	Germany / France
RBS 56 BILL / RBS 56B BILL 2	man-portable ATGM	Sweden
SADARM	submunition	United States
SMArt 155	artillery shell submunition	Germany
Spike	ATGM	Israel
Strix mortar round	guided mortar bomb	Sweden
Toophan 3M (Note: The Toophan is a reverse engineered clone of the BGM-71 TOW)	SACLOS ATGM	Iran
Type 01 LMAT	man-portable ATGM	Japan
XM395 Precision Guided Mortar Munition	guided mortar bomb	United States

== See also ==
- Plunging fire
