= 152 mm gun-howitzer D-20 =

Soviet 152 mm towed howitzer

D-20
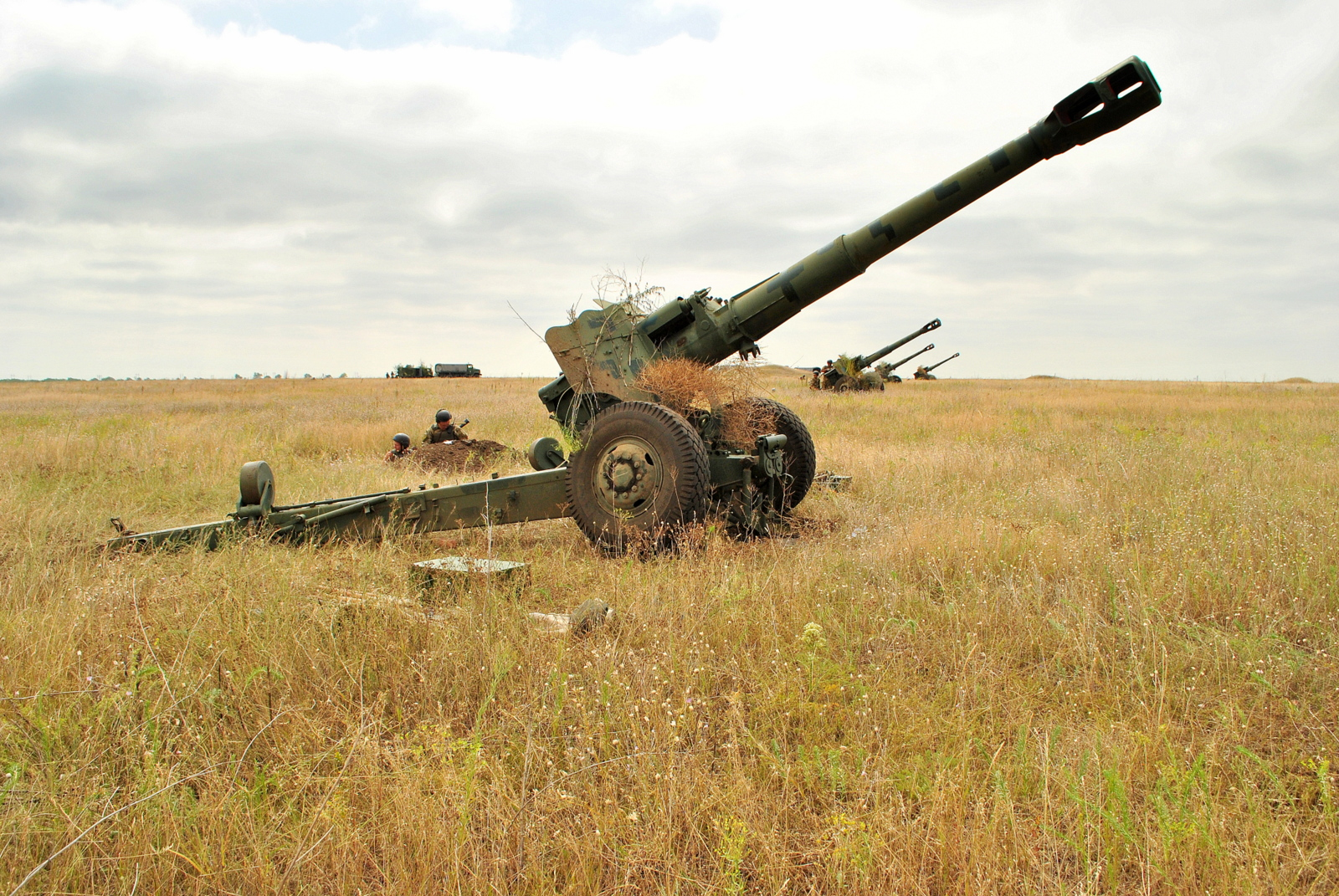
- Type: Towed howitzer
- Place of origin: Soviet Union

Service history
- Used by: Soviet Union, many others
- Wars: Vietnam War; Six-Day War; Yom Kippur War; Soviet–Afghan War; Iran–Iraq War; Lebanese Civil War; First Nagorno-Karabakh War; Syrian Civil War; Russo-Ukrainian War; Second Nagorno-Karabakh War; many others

Production history
- Designer: Petrov Artillery Design Bureau
- Designed: 1947
- Manufacturer: Artillery Plant Number 9, Yekaterinburg

Specifications
- Mass: 5.7 t (5.6 long tons; 6.3 short tons)
- Length: 8.69 m (28 ft 6 in)
- Barrel length: 5.195 m (20 ft) L/34 (with muzzle brake)
- Width: 2.35 m (7 ft 9 in)
- Height: 1.93 m (6 ft 4 in)
- Crew: 8
- Shell: 152.4 x 547.5 mm R Separate loading charge and projectile
- Caliber: 152.4 mm (6.00 in)
- Breech: Vertical semi-automatic sliding-wedge
- Recoil: Hydraulic buffer and hydro-pneumatic recuperator
- Carriage: Split trail
- Elevation: -5° to 45°
- Traverse: 58°
- Rate of fire: Burst: 5–6 rpm Sustained: 1 rpm
- Muzzle velocity: 650 m/s (2,100 ft/s)
- Effective firing range: 17.4 km (10.8 mi)
- Maximum firing range: 24 km (15 mi) (rocket-assisted projectile)
- Sights: PG1M indirect sight and OP4M direct fire sight

The 152 mm gun-howitzer M1955, also known as the D-20, (Russian: 152-мм пушка-гаубица Д-20 обр. 1955 г.) is a manually loaded, towed 152 mm gun-howitzer artillery piece, manufactured in the Soviet Union during the 1950s. It was first observed by the West in 1955, at which time it was designated the M1955. Its GRAU index is 52-P-546.

== History ==
152 mm has been a Russian caliber since World War I, when Britain supplied 6-inch howitzers and Russia purchased 152 mm guns from Schneider (probably derived from the 155 mm Gun Mle 1877/16) for the Imperial Army. The new gun-howitzer, was a replacement of the pre-war ML-20 gun-howitzer (the 152 mm howitzer M1937) and various World War II era 152 mm field howitzers, Model 09/30, Model 1910/30, Model 1938 (M10) and Model 1943 (D-1).

By Soviet definition, a 152 mm howitzer is "medium"-caliber artillery. It was designated a "gun-howitzer" because its muzzle velocity exceeded 600 m/s, and its barrel length exceeded 30 calibers. It equipped battalions in the motor rifle division artillery regiment and army level artillery brigades.

The design, which was probably initiated in the late 1940s, was first seen in public in 1955. It was designed by the well-established design bureau at Artillery Plant No. 9 in Sverdlovsk, now Motovilikha Plants in Yekaterinburg, led by the eminent artillery designer Fyodor Fyodorovich Petrov, who was responsible for several World War II pieces. The gun's factory designation was "D-20".

The carriage is the same one used for the D-74 122 mm field gun. The barrel assembly is the basis for the D-22 (GRAU index: 2A33), which is used for the self-propelled 2S3 Akatsiya ("Acacia").

== Description ==
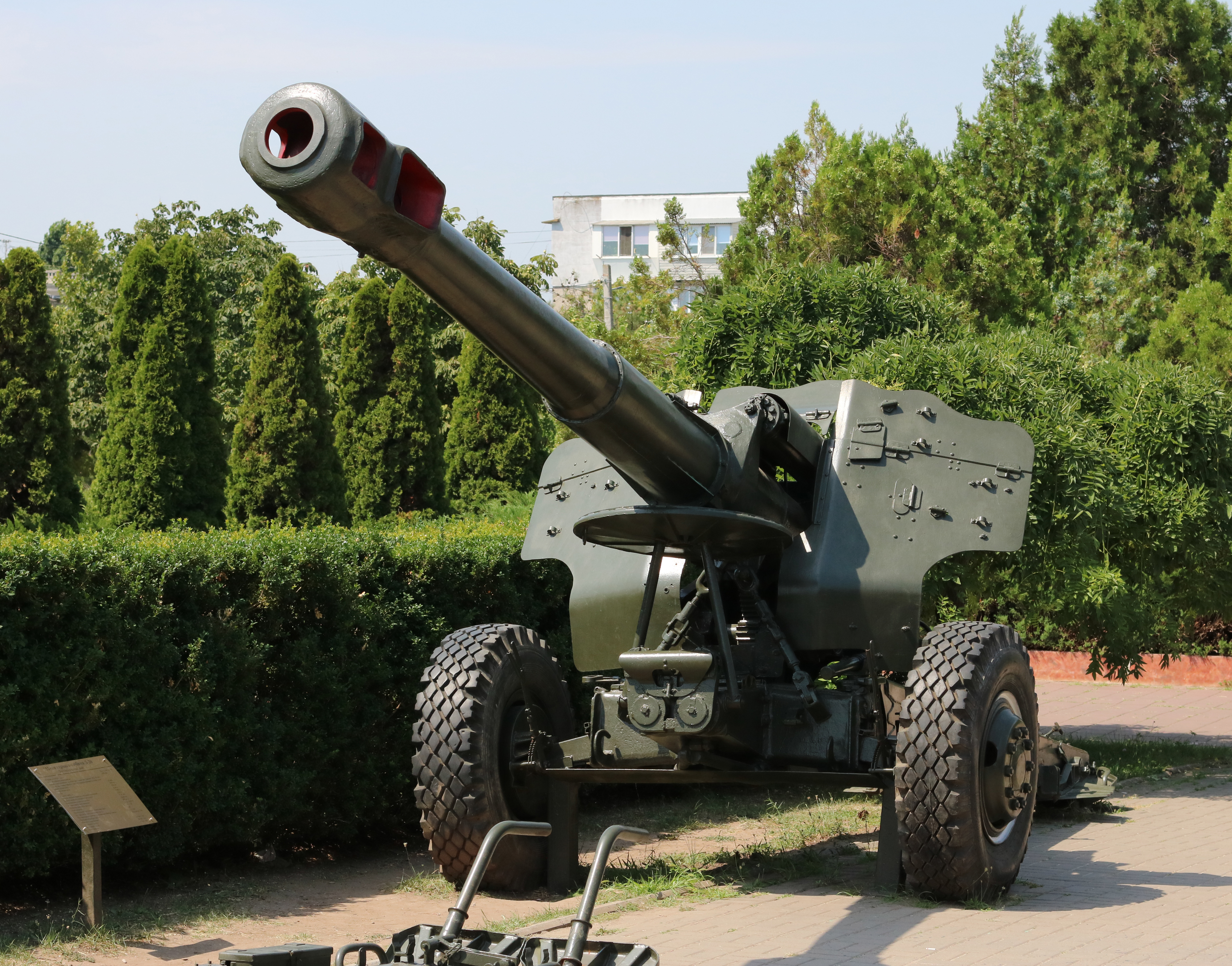
An M1955 as a monument in Chornomorsk, Ukraine

The D-20 has a 26 caliber (3.962 m) barrel, with a double baffle muzzle brake and a semi-automatic vertical sliding-block breech, with a tied jaw and the block moving down to open. The barrel is mounted in a long ring cradle with the trunnions just forward of the breech. The recoil system (buffer and recuperator) is mounted on the cradle above the barrel. Compression balancing gear is attached behind the saddle support, passing through the complex shaped saddle to connect to the cradle just forward of the trunnions. This can be manually repressured by a pump below the breech. The breech has a projectile retaining catch to prevent the shell sliding out at higher elevations before it is rammed with a manual rammer.

Top traverse totals 58° and the vertical elevation range is −5° to 45°.

Box girder section split trail legs are hinged to the cradle support, with bolts to lock them into either the open or closed position. The cradle support has a bolt for locking the barrel in the center for traverse before towing the gun. Large spades are permanently fixed close to the end of each trail. These are hinged and it appears that the gun can be fired with them up or down depending on the terrain. They are always up when the gun is towed.

To assist with all-round carriage traverse, there is a pivot jack mounted at the front of the cradle support. The pivot jack is not a sole plate and the gun fires with its foam filled rubber tired wheels supporting the gun on the ground. When the gun is brought into action, the pivot jack is folded down and adjusted to be on the ground. If a large traverse is required, small jacks on each trail leg are rotated downwards, and the trails jacked up until the main wheels are lifted clear of the ground and the bogey wheels mounted on each trail leg swung downwards and the trail jacks raised. The carriage is then traversed, and the trail jacks reused to lift the bogey wheels and then place the piece back on its main wheels.

The pivot jack is used to secure the barrel against vertical movement when the gun is being towed. The barrel is locked in the center for traverse with a bolt on the cradle support. The jack is folded upwards, lugs on the ring cradle engage the jack base and two tensioners fixed to the saddle support are hooked to the cradle. These are tightened to lock the cradle onto the jack base.

As was normal for the period, the gun has a shield, including a folding piece below the cradle support. The center section of the upper shield slides both up and down, and folds to accommodate the barrel at higher elevation angles of fire. The shield may offer some protection against muzzle blast to the sights and layer, although it is usually shown being fired with a long lanyard, but is probably mostly for defense against machine gun fire.

The non-reciprocating sights are standard Soviet pattern, designed for one-man laying. Included are a direct fire anti-tank telescope (OP4M), a panoramic periscopic indirect-fire sight, a dial sight, (PG1M) in a mounting, an angle of sight scale, and a range drum for each charge engraved with the range (distance) scale, coupled to an elevation leveling bubble mounted on dial sight mount. The range drum enables the standard Soviet technique of semi-direct fire when the piece is laid visually on the target, and the range set on the range drum.

Like most Soviet artillery, the gun fires separate ammunition using metal cartridge cases that also provide obturation. The ammunition is interchangeable with that used with other 152 mm guns, although the more modern ones have a third, much larger cartridge. The D-20 uses two types of cartridge. One has a base charge and up to five increments, the other is a single 'super' charge cartridge.

The standard shell weight is 44 kg with a muzzle velocity of 655 m/s, but some projectiles are more or less than this. The basic shell is high explosive (HE) and fragmentation (HE-frag). Other projectiles include smoke, illuminating, chemical and probably incendiary.

Later projectiles include bomblet, anti-personnel land mine, flechette, Krasnopol precision-guided munition (PGM), communication jammer, and extended range HE using rocket assistance (RAP). The normal maximum range is 17.4 km, RAP being farther. Two direct-fire anti-tank projectiles have been used, high-explosive anti-tank (HEAT) and armour-piercing ammunition (APHE), the latter being 5.2 kg heavier and with a lower muzzle velocity.

The maximum rate of fire is usually stated as five rounds per minute, and 65 rounds per hour sustained. In Soviet service, the unit of fire was 60 rounds.

The detachment was either 8 or 10 men, probably differing between armies and the time period. In Soviet service, the 5,700 kg gun was usually towed by a URAL-375 6×6 truck or, in some regions, an AT-S or AT-L medium tractor.

== Operational history ==
During the 2022 invasion of Ukraine both sides have relied on the D-20. Russian forces have started deploying the weapons from storage. There are reports of at least one Russian D-20 being destroyed due to poor ammunition. This weapon was in the service of the Luhansk People’s Republic.

== Variants ==
=== Russian Federation ===
- The Khitin is an improved version with an automatic rammer for an increased firing rate of 7-8 rounds per minute.

=== People's Republic of China ===
- Type 66 – Licensed version of D-20 built by Norinco.
- Type 83 – Self-propelled version of Type 66 built by Norinco.

=== North Korea ===
The US Defense Intelligence Agency has reported the existence of several self-propelled artillery systems, mating existing cannon systems with a locally designed chassis. The SPH 152 mm M1974 appears to be a D-20 or Type 66 mounted on a tracked chassis Tokchon.

=== Vietnam ===
An unnamed self-propelled version of D-20 placed on 8×8 chassis developed by Viettel.

== Similar weapons ==
=== Romania ===
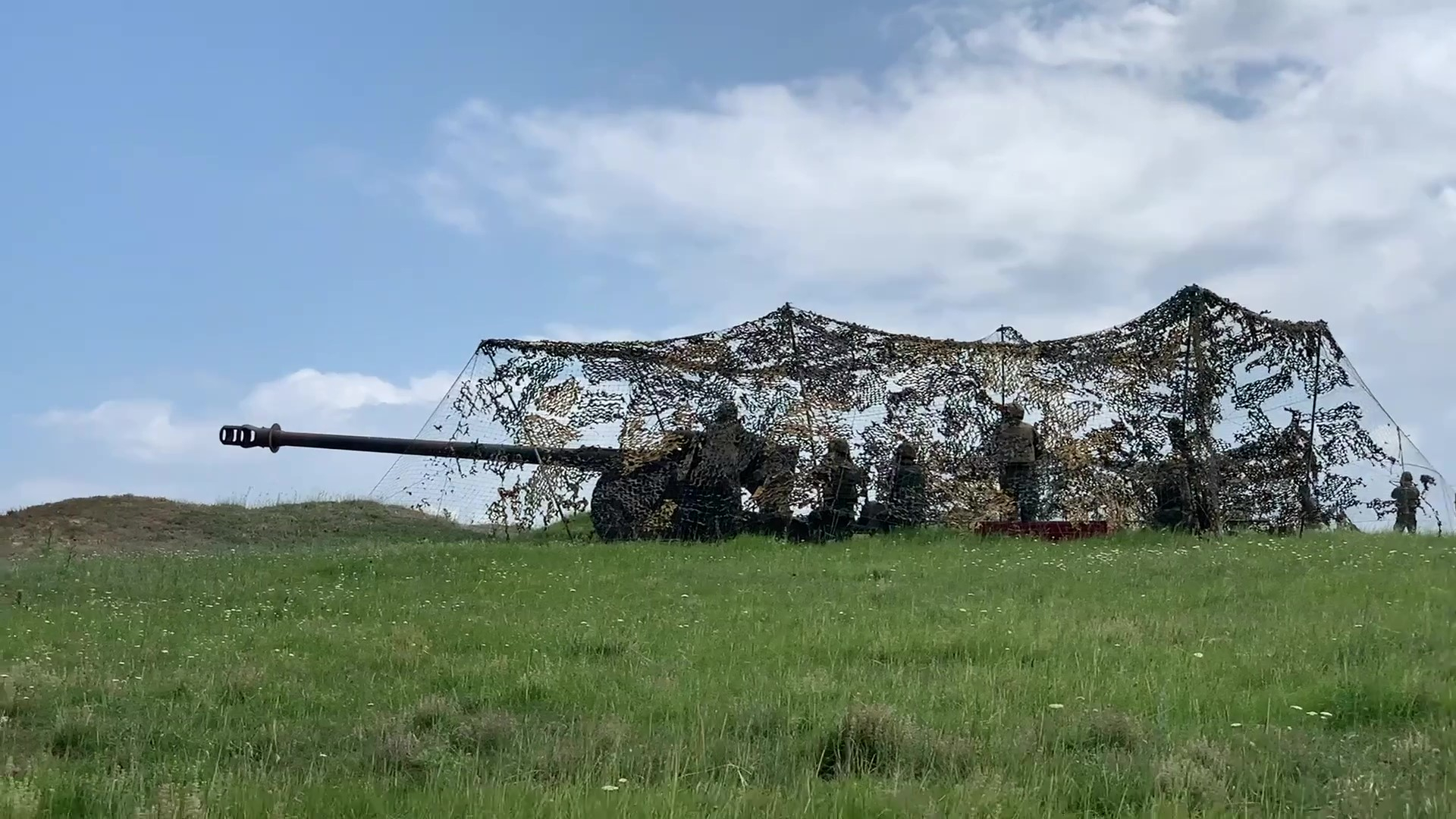
Romanian M1985 in firing position

- M1981 − A 152 mm howitzer developed for the Romanian Army, it uses a carriage that is similar in some respects to the D-20, and the D-74 122 mm field gun, as a circular firing pedestal is fitted and is inverted and secured just forward of the gun shield when in travel position.
- M1985 − A 152 mm howitzer developed as a follow on to the M1981 for the Romanian Army, the carriage is very similar to the D-20, but it has a longer barrel giving it a greater range.

=== Former Yugoslavia ===
- Gun-howitzer M84 NORA or NORA (Serbo-Croatian: novo oružje artiljerije) – Uses a carriage similar to the D-20 and can fire D-20 ammunition, but it has a longer barrel while the carriage is modified to improve ballistic performance and to make handling the weapon in firing position quicker and easier for the crews.

== Ammunition ==
- HE-frag, OF-32 – range 17,400 metres
- DPICM
- DPICM-BB
- Incendiary
- Expendable jammer
- Chemical
- Flechette
- Semi-active laser-guided "Krasnopol"

== Wars ==
- Vietnam War
- Sino-Indian War
- Indo-Pakistani War of 1965
- Six-Day War
- War of Attrition
- Sino-Soviet border conflict
- Yom Kippur War
- Lebanese Civil War
- Soviet–Afghan War
- Sino-Vietnamese War
- Iran–Iraq War
- Sri Lankan Civil War
- Gulf War
- Iraq War
- Yugoslav wars
- Syrian Civil War
- War in Donbass
- Iraqi Civil War (2014–2017)
- Yemeni Civil War (2015–present)
- 2022 Russian invasion of Ukraine

== Operators ==
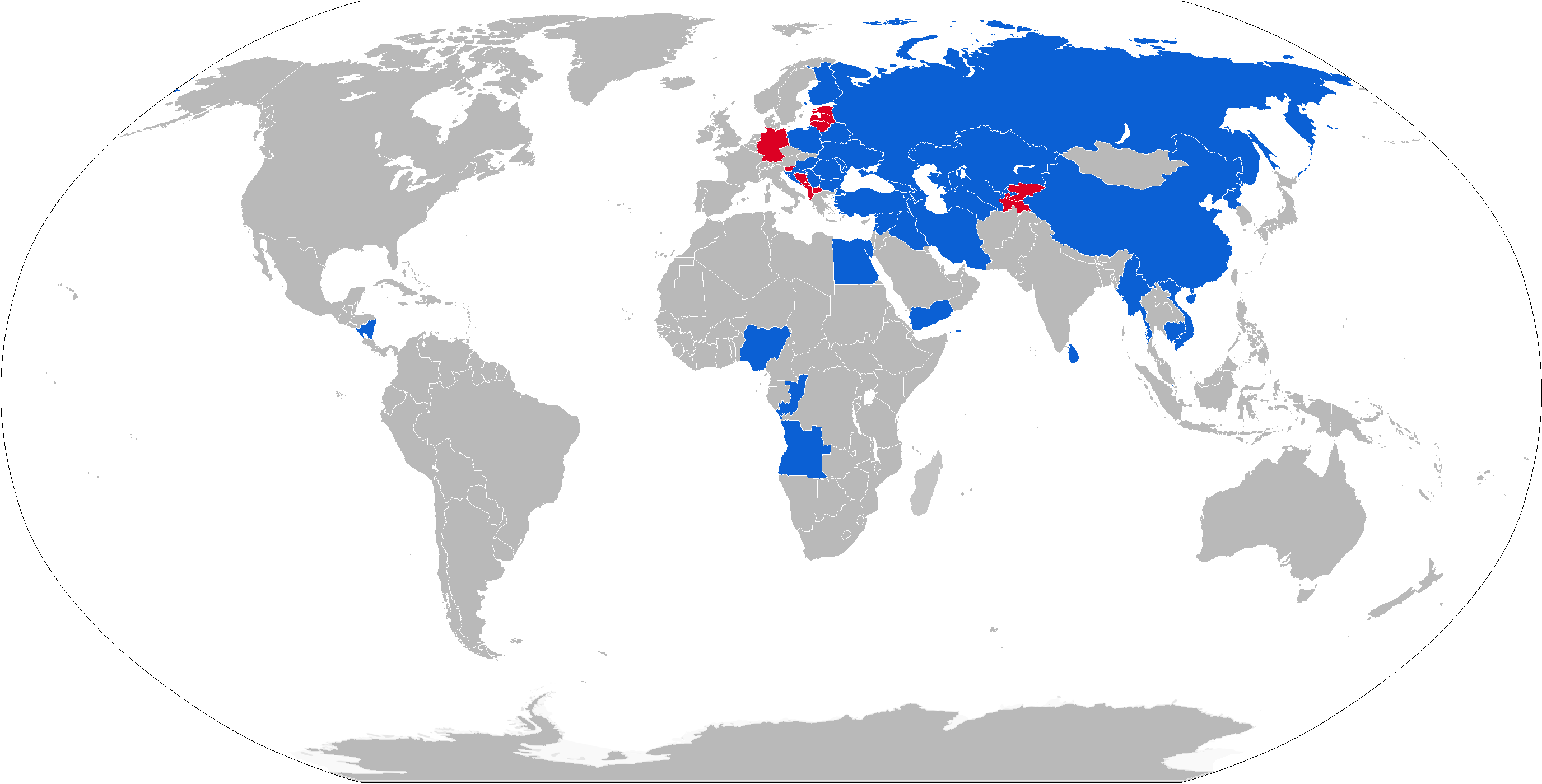
Operators: Current Former

=== Current ===
- Angola – 4 as of 2016
- Armenia – 34 as of 2016
- Azerbaijan – 24 as of 2016
- Belarus
- Bulgaria – 44 as of 2016
- Cuba – 100, supplied between 1972–1974
- Democratic Republic of the Congo – 6
- Ethiopia – 20
- Georgia – 12 received from Bulgaria in 2009
- China – Type 66
- Republic of the Congo
- Hungary – 18 as of 2016
- Iran – 30 as of 2016
- Iraq – All destroyed in 2003 invasion of Iraq, new models bought from Bulgaria in 2015
  - Iraqi Kurdistan – 6 captured from Iraqi Army in 1991, 4 captured in 2003, 10 in total used by Kurdistan Democratic Party (KDP) Peshmerga
- Laos – in service as of January 2019
- Moldova – as of 2016
- Myanmar – 150+ delivered in 2009 from North Korea and Ukraine
- Nicaragua – 12 serving, 30 stored as of 2016
- Nigeria – 4 M81/M85 from Romanian Army stocks
- North Korea – 200 possibly supplied by China in 1972–1975
- Russia – 1,075 as of 2016 - 575 as of 2025
- Romania – Romanian Army has 247 M1981 howitzers, 103 M1985 gun-howitzers
- Sri Lanka – 46 Type 66 as of 2016
- Syria
- Turkmenistan – 72 as of 2016
- Ukraine – 130+ as of 2016
- Vietnam
- Yemen

=== Former ===
- Albania – 90 type 66 supplied from 1968–1973
- Artsakh − Seized by Azerbaijan after the 2023 Azerbaijani offensive in Nagorno-Karabakh
- Bolivia − 18 Type 66 delivered by China in 1992
- East Germany – 137 supplied in 1974–1975, passed to Germany after German unification
- Egypt – 300 supplied between 1964–1970
- Finland – 126 bought from ex-DDR in 1991; phased out 2017; known as 152 H 55
- Germany – Phased out
- Kazakhstan
- Soviet Union – passed to successor states
- Uzbekistan
- Yugoslavia – 36 supplied in 1971

== Gallery ==
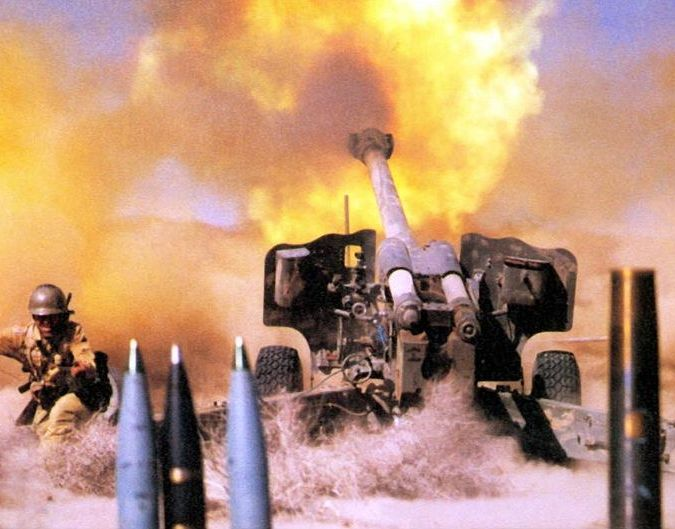
An Iranian D20 during the Iran–Iraq War

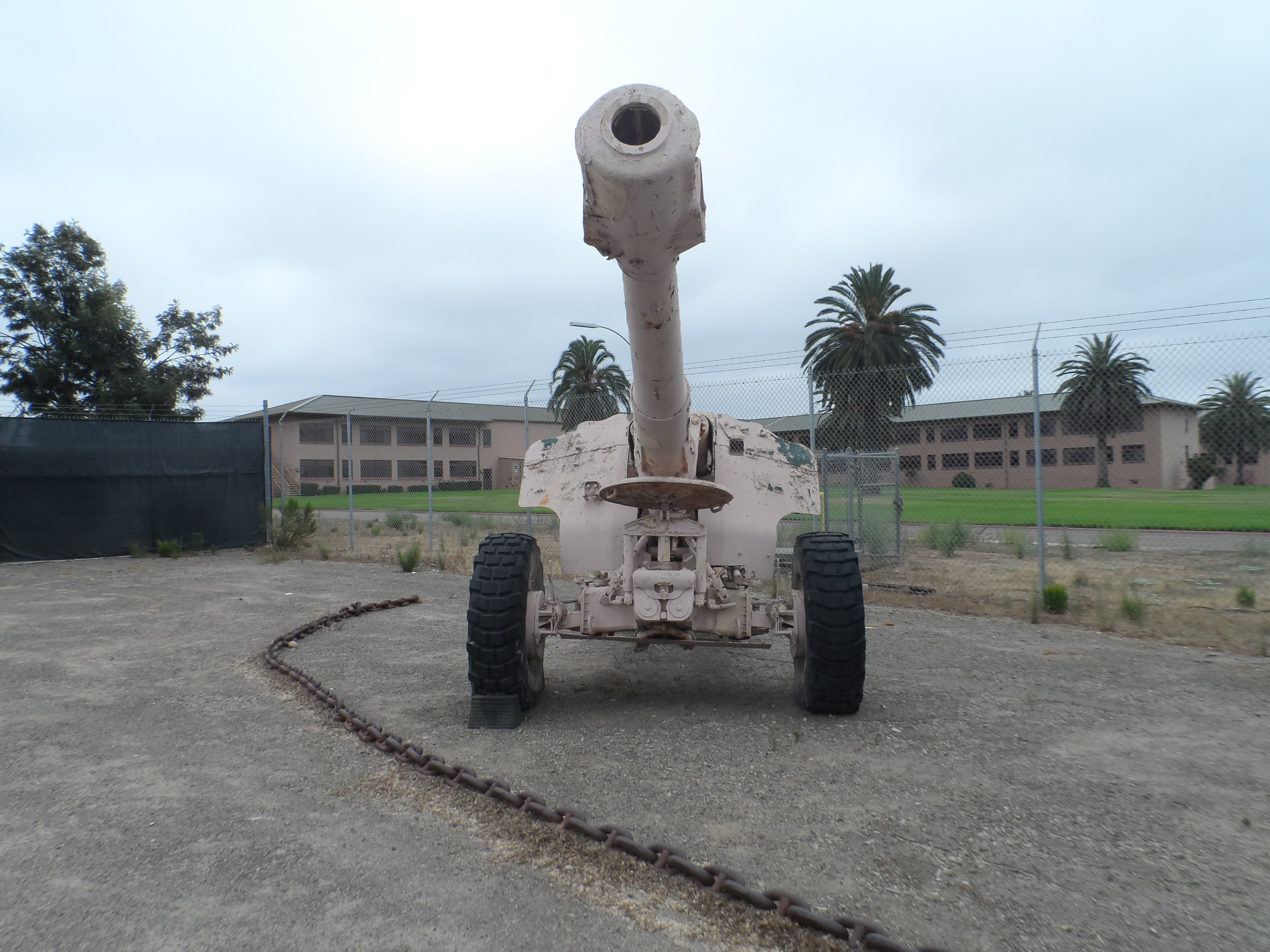
A Chinese Type 66 howitzer at the Flying Leatherneck Aviation Museum

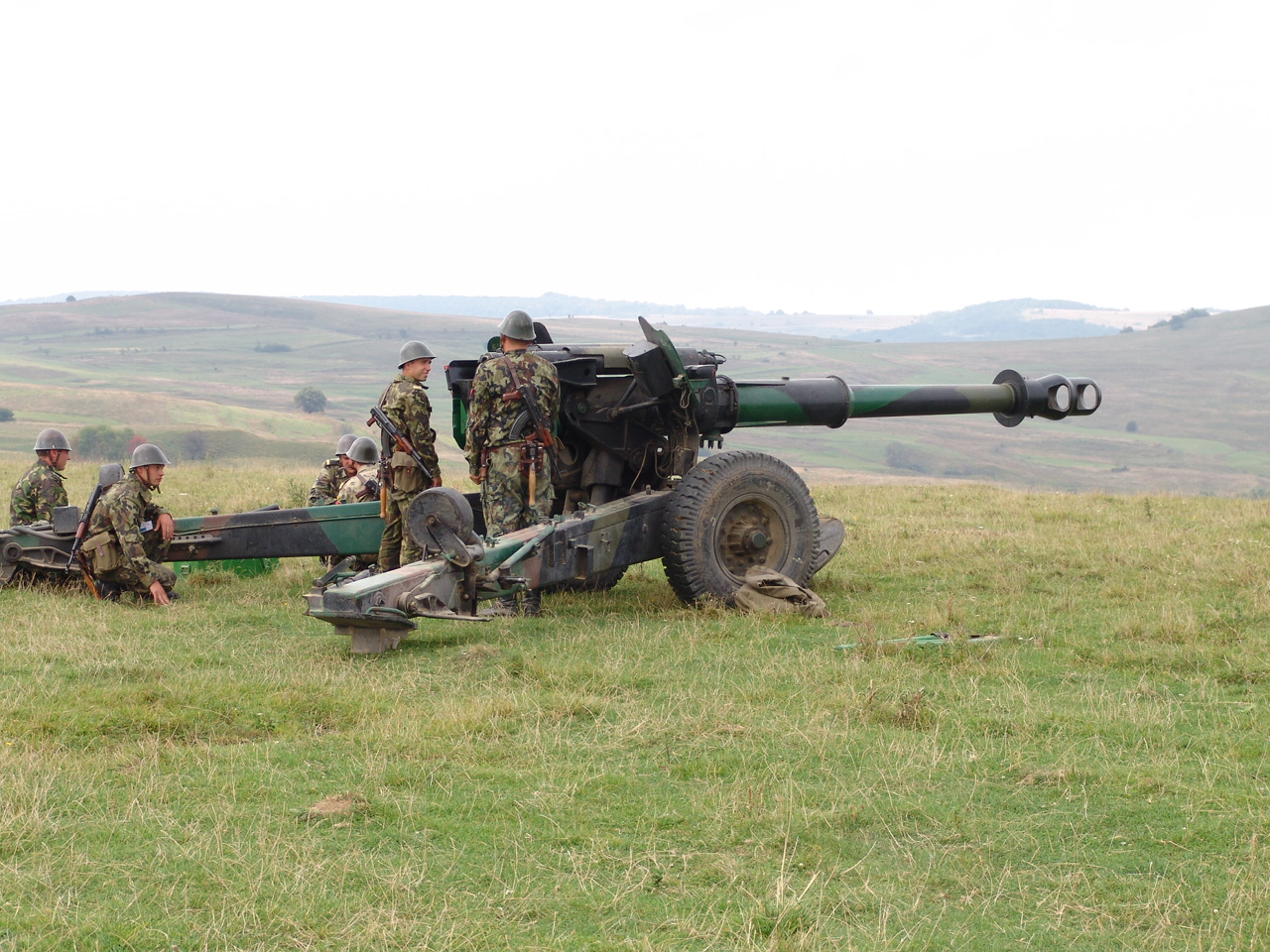
A Romanian M1981

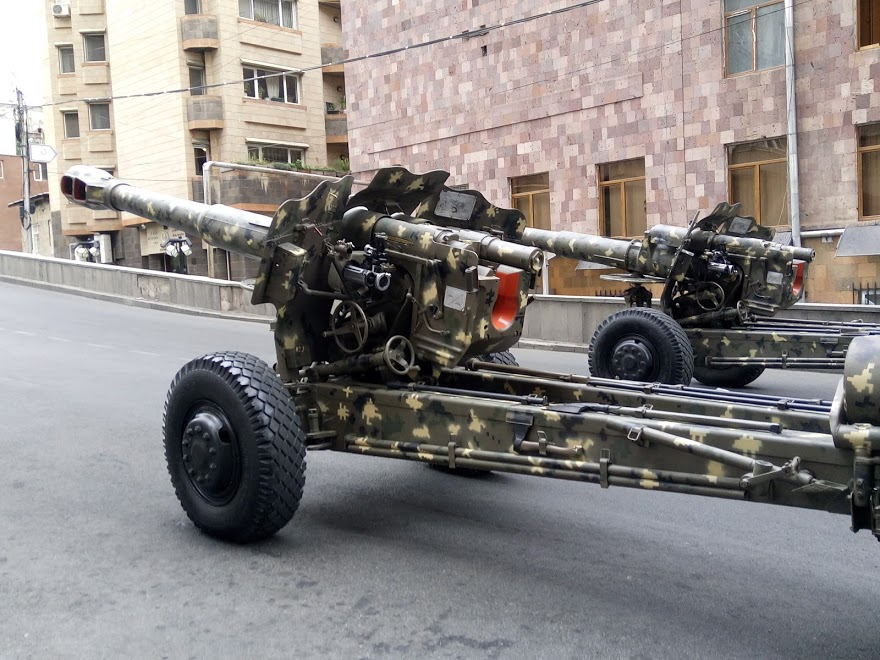
An Armenian Army D-20 during the military parade in Yerevan

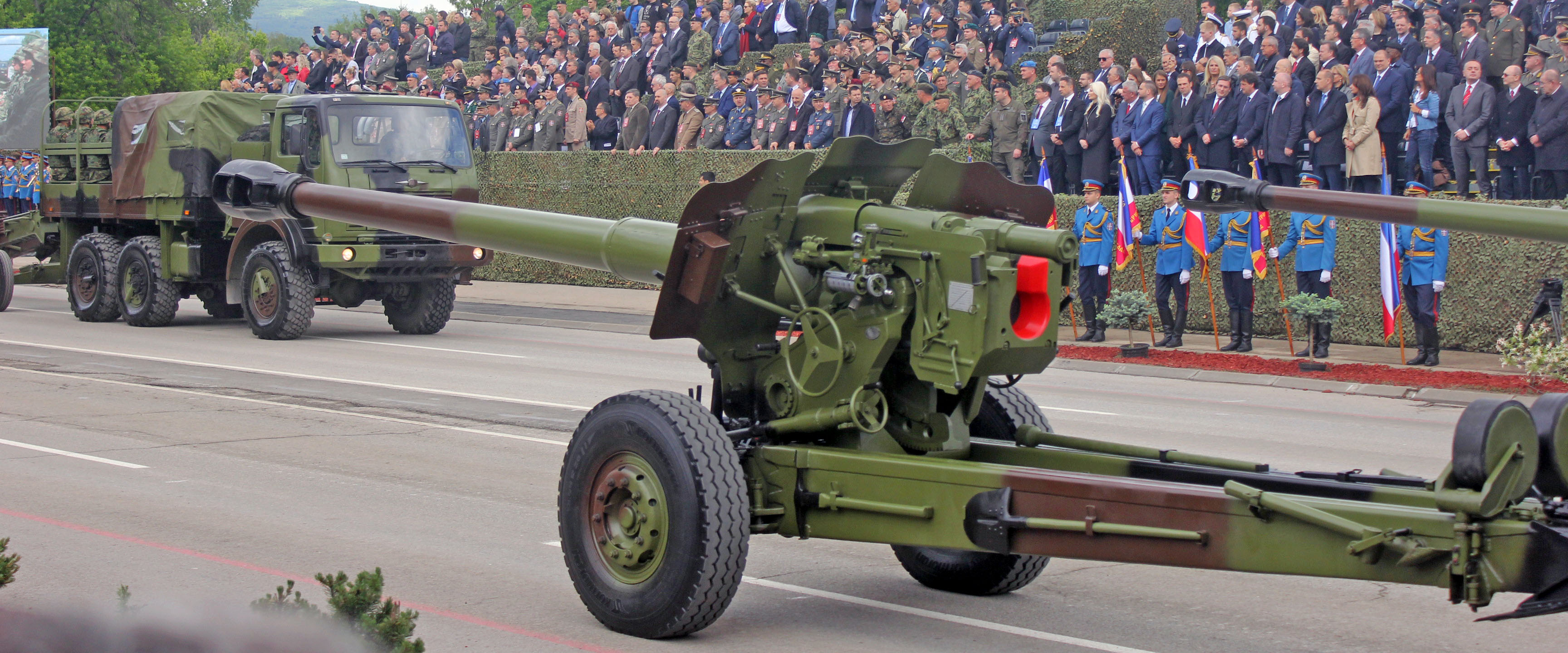
A Serbian Army M-84 Nora-A 152 mm howitzer at military parade in Niš

== See also ==
- 2A36 Giatsint-B
