= Tamang =

Tamang may refer to:

- Tamang people, an ethnic group in Nepal and India
  - Tamangic languages, their Tibeto-Burman languages
    - Tamang language, a dialect cluster
  - Tamang (surname), a surname
    - Prem Singh Tamang, chief minister of Sikkim, India

== See also ==
- Taman (disambiguation)
- Prem Singh Tamang ministry (disambiguation)
