= Krasnopol (weapon system) =

Soviet/Russian guided 152/155 mm artillery shell

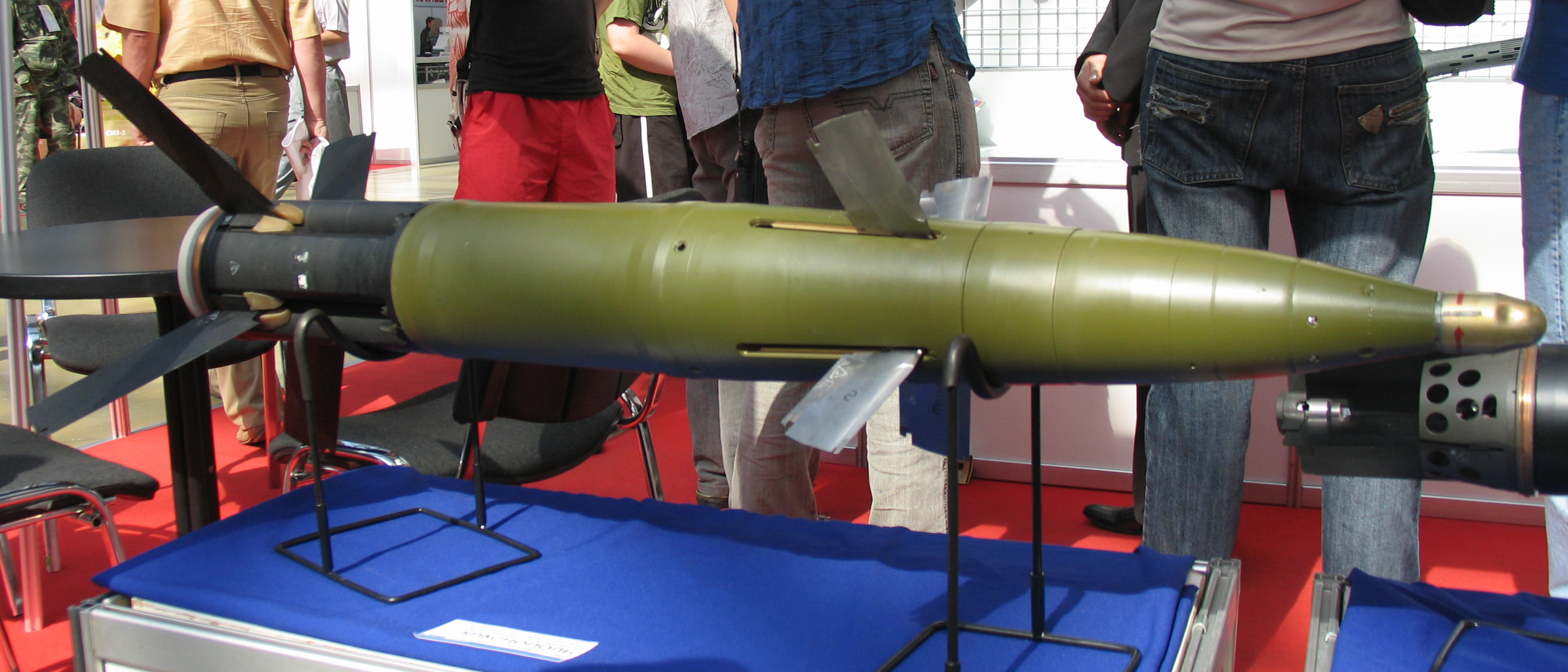
- 30F39 Krasnopol guided projectile
- Type: Guided artillery shell
- Place of origin: Soviet Union/Russia

Service history
- In service: 1986–present
- Used by: Soviet Army; Russian Army; Syrian Arab Army; Indian Army
- Wars: Kargil War; Syrian Civil War; Second Libyan Civil War; Russo-Ukrainian War

Production history
- Manufacturer: KBP Instrument Design Bureau
- Produced: 1986–present
- Variants: 2K25 Krasnopol; 2K25M Krasnopol-M; K155M Krasnopol-M2; Krasnopol-d

Specifications
- Mass: 50 kg (110 lb); K155M: 54 kg (119 lb)
- Length: 1,300 mm (51 in)
- Diameter: 152 mm and 155 mm
- Caliber: 152 mm and 155 mm
- Effective firing range: Krasnopol: 20 km (12 mi); K155M: 25 km (16 mi); Krasnopol-D: 43 km (27 mi) (with 2S19 gun) or 60 km (37 mi) (with 2S35 gun)
- Warhead: High explosive
- Warhead weight: Krasnopol: 6.50 kg (14.33 lb); Krasnopol-M: 11.00 kg (24.25 lb); K155M: 11 kg (24 lb)
- Guidance system: Laser guidance K155M: GLONASS-GPS, Semi-active laser homing

The 2K25 Krasnopol is a Soviet 152/155 mm cannon-launched, fin-stabilized, base bleed-assisted, semi-automatic laser-guided artillery weapon system. It automatically 'homes' on a point illuminated by a laser designator, typically operated by a drone or ground-based artillery observer. Krasnopol projectiles are fired mainly from Soviet self-propelled howitzers such as the 2S3 Akatsiya and 2S19 Msta-S and are intended to engage small ground targets such as tanks, other direct fire weapons, strong-points, or other significant point targets visible to the observer. It can be used against both stationary and moving targets (providing these remain within the observer's field of view).

== Development ==
The weapon system was developed in the Tula-based KBP Instrument Design Bureau under the supervision of A. G. Shipunov. Work on the project was initiated in the 1970s. In February 1986 the Krasnopol system was adopted by the Soviet Army under the designation 3OF39, and began mass production in Izhmash and Izhmeh factories. Since 2002, it is augmented by the 120- and 122 mm Kitolov-2 laser-guided system.

A 155 mm variant of the project was also developed to access the commercial markets, which can be fired from howitzers such as the G6 and M109A6. Besides Russia, the Krasnopol is also manufactured by Chinese defence industry conglomerate Norinco.

On July 28, 2022, Russian news agency TASS reported that Kalashnikov Group is working on an modernization of Krasnopol with increased range, better at striking small-size targets, enhanced warhead and raised efficiency during clouds and strong wind.

In early 2023, it was reported that Russia had increased the production of Krasnopol "several times" for the needs of the war in Ukraine.

The development and trial use of a drone-carried version was reportedly completed as of May 22, 2023. Supplies of a modernized version began in August 2023 and its application in November 2023.

== Description ==
The 2K25 Krasnopol system consists of the 3OF39 precision shell, a 1D22, 1D20, or 1D15 laser target designator (LTD), and the 1A35 shot synchronization system. The laser designation system has a range of 5 kilometres (3.1 mi), while the projectile itself has a range of 20 kilometres (12 mi) and a target seeker radius of 1 kilometre (0.62 mi). The two-part projectile is divided into the following sections: target seeker, guidance module, warhead and rear compartment. The seeker and guidance module are stored as a single component in sealed container, as is the rear section with warhead; this allows the oversized projectile to be loaded and transported inside existing ammunition containers in legacy self-propelled howitzers. The two components are joined immediately prior to firing.

The system functions as follows. The observer determines the target location (e.g. map coordinates or bearing and distance from their own position), ensures that their laser target designator can 'mark' the target and requests or orders a fire mission against the target using Krasnopol. A gun is then aimed at the target location and a guided shell is fired. The firing unit uses their 1A35K command device to send a signal via a communications link confirming the firing of the projectile to the 1A35I observation post device with the observer. The laser target designator is then used to illuminate the target and the in-flight projectile detects the radiant laser energy reflected by the target and the navigation system steers the shell towards the point of greatest incident energy—the designated target with top attack pattern. The iris of the optical seeker head is protected by a cap which is ejected by a mechanical timer upon firing. The guidance module contains an inertial reference system, a power source, various electric motors and controls and four folding wings used to execute command guidance signals. The warhead is a high explosive fragmentation type which can also be used against heavily armored vehicles such as tanks owing to the steep trajectory of the projectile which allows it to defeat the relatively thin roof armor on most vehicles. Behind the warhead is a rear compartment which houses four folding stabilizers. Krasnopol system can also fire a salvo from multiple artillery pieces on one target using a single laser designator.

After destruction of the initial target, the LTD operator may request or order another target. If these subsequent targets are close together they should be upwind (from the previous target) to reduce smoke and dust interference with the designator.

Krasnopol is capable of hitting targets moving at speeds up to 36 km/h (22 mph).

=== Performance problems in India ===
India originally purchased a number of Krasnopol systems from Russia at a price of $40,000 a piece, and used them in the 1999 Kargil War. During the war, Krasnopol was used to strike bunkers where the army wanted to avoid avalanches and hitting surrounding pathways and their use was important for encouraging the development of the M982 Excalibur System from the United States.

In December 2006, the Indian Express reported that India's Russian Krasnopol 155 mm laser-guided shells have exhibited defective performance during Army test-firing in the Mahajan ranges in Rajasthan in 2004 and 2005. In March 2007, Defence Minister Shri AK Antony confirmed the extent of the problem.

In a June 2009 report the Comptroller and Auditor General of India said, "Krasnopol proved to be a complete dud during testing at high altitudes, as it was woefully short on both range and accuracy. 'Such procurement of defective quality ammunition adversely impact the Army's operational preparedness,' "

The performance issue of the shell appears to be linked to the unique high altitude environments the Indian army has to conduct operations in. An environment not envisioned when designing the shell. "The problem is that the ammunition works when fired in the plains but goes totally inaccurate when it's being fired from, say, 11,000 feet to a target at 17,000 feet," sources said. The Army is hoping that the Russian team will find a way to correct the defect in the munitions.". The age of some of the stockpile has also been cited as a source of the problem "The Indian army attributed these problems to age related decline in the ammunition and a newer batch was ordered in 2002, "The performance of the first lot of quantity 1000 rounds of projectiles procured in 1999 has deteriorated over the years, recently during test firing by the Army, it was observed that the performance was not up to the mark".

The Russian Academy of Sciences established the following findings. "Krasnopol projectile was developed for use at heights of up to 3000 m...the highest range in the Northern Caucauses at a height of 2500 m." The Indian army tested the round at 4500 m. "Two Krasnopol projectiles fired at the range appeared to be short of the homing head lock on zone due to incorrect firing tables." and the use of NATO charges instead of Russian contributed to the fault, "standard NATO propellant charges used in the FH-77B artillery system at zero and sub zero temperatures have unstable characteristics, particularly the muzzle velocity". "To exclude abnormal operation of the Krasnopol projectile in highland conditions the Instrument Design Bureau has developed and introduced improvements... which provide equal accuracy in the highlands and plains." Listed improvements were: Replace NATO propellent charges with Russian ones that have a temperature range of -50 °C to +60 °C. Adjustment of sustainer ignition timing from 7.0 s to 0.3 s after firing. The projectile was tested in the Jammu and Kashmir ranges at heights up to 4500 m and over 1000 m height differences between target and fire position. "Targets were directly hit and completely destroyed." "Each target was killed with a single Krasnopol projectile."

Since 2019 India uses the M982 Excalibur 155 mm extended range guided artillery shell developed by the US Army, in addition to the Krasnopol. A 2018 competitive assessment by the Indian Army of various available 155 mm precision-guided rounds selected the M982 Excalibur for purchase. It did not include Krasnopol in the comparison. It's believed that the more expensive M982 will eventually replace Krasnopol in the Indian inventory.

=== Russian invasion of Ukraine ===
Krasnopol has been widely used by Russian forces since the beginning of the invasion of Ukraine; its compatibility with various Russian artillery systems such as D-20 and 2A65 Msta-B towed howitzers, and self-propelled 2S3 Akatsiya, 2S19 Msta-S and 2S35 Koalitsiya-SV howitzers make it a common sight on all fronts and more popular than the smaller Kitolov-2M 120 mm - 122 mm guided munition system. It has been used against all kinds of targets, including infantry, fortifications, towed artillery pieces but also self-propelled guns and mobile targets like tanks and transport vehicles.

On 14 November 2023, the UK MoD reported that Russia has increased its production of 152mm Krasnopol shells. These shells are laser guided however they are affected by winter weather, with clouds able to stop any laser guidance. The increase in the production of this weapon is due to a possible emphasis on efficiency of their artillery.

== Variants ==
- 2K25 Krasnopol

The original model of the Krasnopol was designed to be used with former Soviet-Bloc artillery systems of 152 mm (6.0 in), such as D-20, 2S3 Akatsiya, 2A65 (Msta-B). Krasnopol carries a 20.5 kilograms (45 lb) high explosive fragmentation warhead. The entire missile weighs 50 kilograms (110 lb). However, its length made it incompatible with the autoloader of the 2S19 152 mm Self-Propelled Gun.

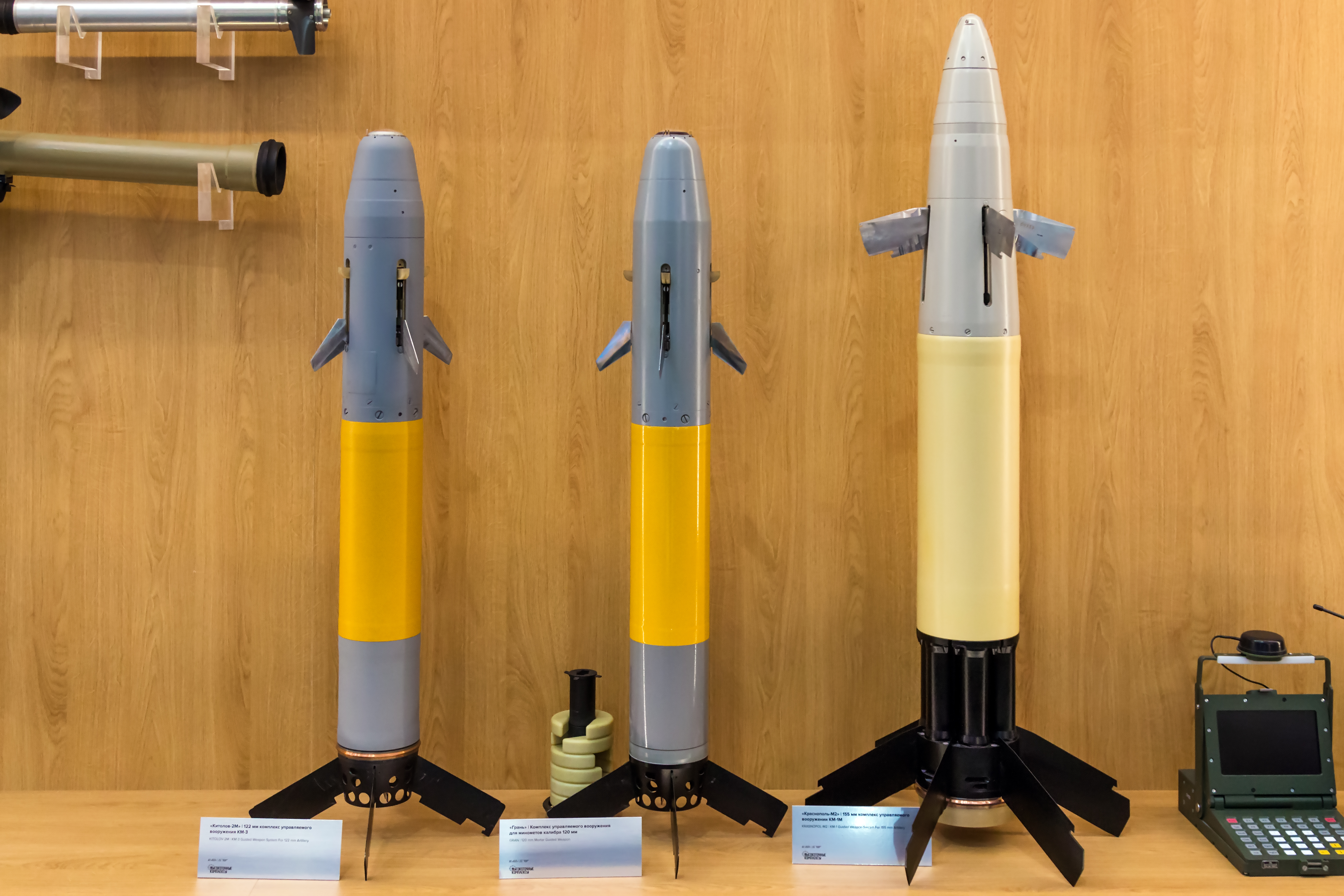
From left to right: 122 mm Kitolov-2M, 120 mm Gran and 155 mm Krasnopol-M2.

- 2K25M Krasnopol-M

The Krasnopol-M was a miniaturized version of the projectile, developed in the mid-1990s by Shipunov's team at the KBP Design Bureau taking advantage of new electronics technology acquired in the design of the 120 mm Kitolov-2 guided projectile (similar in construction and purpose; this is in essence a smaller model of the Krasnopol to be used with the 2S9 NONA 120 mm mortar and designated 3OF69 and a related projectile for 122 mm howitzers designated Kitolov-2M 3OF69M) was made with a shorter length to enable it to be used with autoloader-equipped self-propelled guns without having to be disassembled into two parts. It also comes in an alternate 155 mm (6.1 in) caliber to allow it to be used with NATO-standard 155 mm howitzers. Besides the reduced total length, the Krasnopol-M also has a different protective cap for the optical seeker.

- K155M

Krasnopol-155M is a further development based on Krasnopol-M, is a 155 mm artillery projectile designed to engage armored targets. It uses a semi-active laser (SAL) guidance system in the terminal phase of its trajectory. Krasnopol-155М GAP (Guided Artillery Projectiles) was developed to be used with artillery systems such as M109A1-6, G5/G6, FH77, M777, TRF1 among others.

- GP1 and GP6: Chinese versions of Krasnopol.

== Users ==
- Algeria
- China
- Greece
- India
- Russian Federation
- Syria
- Ukraine Captured from Russia during the ongoing 2022 invasion

== See also ==
- Kvitnyk Ukraine manufactured equivalent
- Kitolov-2M – (Russia)
- KM-8 Gran – (Russia)
- M712 Copperhead – (United States)
- M982 Excalibur – (United States, Sweden)
- Basir – (Iran)
- XM395 Precision Guided Mortar Munition – (United States)
- Bofors/Nexter Bonus – (Sweden, France)
- Bofors STRIX – (Sweden)
