= Tamam =

Tamam may refer to:

- Tamam, witch in Papua New Guinea animism
- Israel Aerospace Industries Tamam Division, of the Systems Missiles and Space Group of the Israel Aerospace Industries (IAI)
- Tamam (TV series), Greek TV comedy

== See also ==
- Tamam Shud, Australian band
- Tamam Shud, Australian death case
- Taman (disambiguation)
- Tammam, a given name and surname
