= Taman =

Taman may refer to:

== Places ==
=== Africa ===
- Taman, Togo, a town in Bassar Prefecture

=== Asia ===
- Taman, Nepal
- Taman, Pemalang, a district in Pemalang Regency, Central Java
- Taman, a district in Madiun, East Java, Indonesia
- Taman, a district in Sidoarjo Regency, East Java, Indonesia
- Taman Jurong, Singapore
- Taman Melawati, a town in Ulu Klang, Selangor, Malaysia
- Taman OUG, a township in Kuala Lumpur, Malaysia

=== Europe ===
- Taman, Russia, a rural locality
- Port of Taman, a seaport in Russia
- Taman Bay, Russia
- Taman Peninsula, Russia

== Other uses ==
- Taman language (disambiguation), several languages with the name
- Taman, a common Arabic name for the desert grass Panicum turgidum
- Taman Division, a common name of the 2nd Guards Motor Rifle Division of the Russian Ground Forces

== See also ==
- Taman Bukit (disambiguation)
- Tamam (disambiguation)
- Tamang (disambiguation)
- Thaman, Indian music director
