= Taman language =

Taman may refer to:

- Taman language (Indonesia), an Austronesian language of Borneo
- Taman language (Myanmar), an extinct Sino-Tibetan language of Myanmar

== See also ==
- Taman (disambiguation)
- Taman languages, a language group of Africa
- Tama languages, a language group of Papua New Guinea
- Tama language, a language of Chad and Sudan
- Tama language (Colombia)
- Tamang language, a Sino-Tibetan language of Nepal
