= Prem Singh Tamang ministry =

Prem Singh Tamang ministry may refer to these cabinets headed by Prem Singh Tamang as chief minister of Sikkim, India:

- First Tamang ministry (2019–2024)
- Second Tamang ministry (2024–present)

== See also ==
- Tamang (disambiguation)
