= Tammam =

Tammam or Tamam is a masculine given name and surname of Arabic origin. Notable people with the name include:

== Given name ==
=== Tamam ===
- Tamam Al-Akhal (born 1935), Palestinian artist and educator living in Jordan

=== Tammam ===
- Tammam Hassan (1918–2011), Egyptian linguist
- Tammam Raad (born 1965), Syrian politician
- Tammam Salam (born 1945), Lebanese politician
- Tammam ibn Alkama al-Wazir (died 896), Umayyad poet
- Abu Ghalib Tammam ibn Alqama (died 811), Umayyad general in Spain

== Surname ==
- Abu Tammam (788–845), Arab poet
- Abul Ashba ibn Tammam (died 1361), Muslim chemist
- Lucy Tammam, British fashion designer

== See also ==
- Tamam (disambiguation)
