= Griffin LGB =

Laser-guided bomb system in Israel

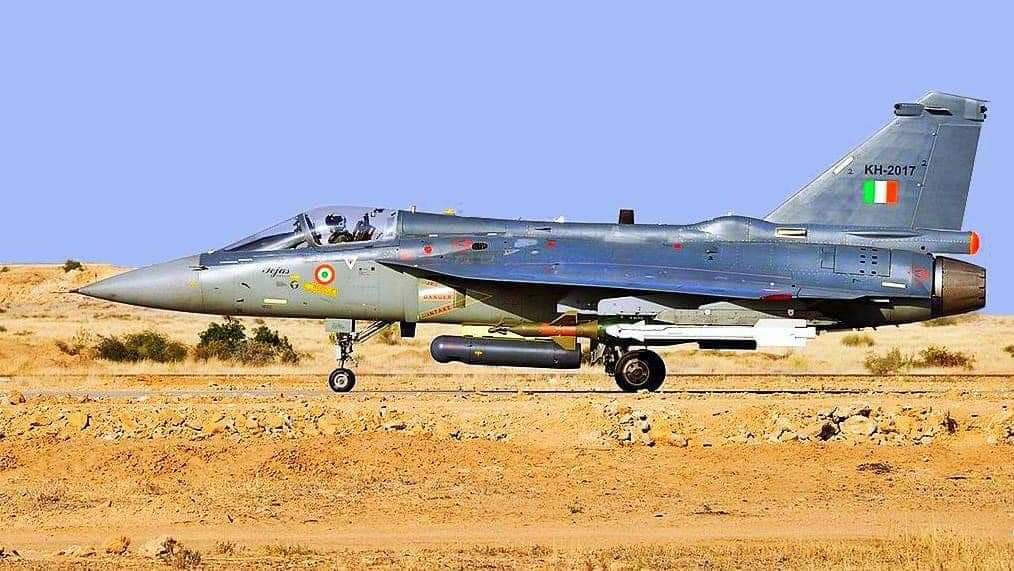
IAF's HAL Tejas (LSP-07) with Griffin LGB (in green and red), Litening III (in metallic grey) and Vympel R-73E (in white).

The Griffin Laser Guided Bomb (Griffin LGB) is a laser-guided bomb system made by Israel Aerospace Industries' MBT missile division. It is an add-on kit which is used to retrofit existing Mark 82, Mark 83, and Mark 84 and other unguided bombs, making them into laser-guided smart bombs (with the option of GPS guidance). Initial development completed in 1990.

The Griffin conversion kit consists of a front "seeker" section and a set of steerable tailplanes. The resulting guided munition features "trajectory shaping", which allows the bomb to fall along a variety of trajectories – from a shallow angle to a vertical top attack profile. IAI claims this gives the weapon a circular error probable of 5 metres.

IAI (which is owned by the Government of Israel) has sold Griffin to the Israel Defense Forces, the Colombian Air Force, and the Indian Air Force; the system may also have been trialled by the South African Air Force. The IDF used Griffins in 1988 to attack Palestinian targets in southern Lebanon and against Hezbollah in 1996 during Operation Grapes of Wrath.

Bombs using the kit have been used on A-4, F-4E, F-15, F-16, Kfir, Super Tucano, Jaguar, Tejas, Sukhoi Su-30MKI, and Atlas Cheetah D aircraft.

== See also ==
- Spice (munition)
- GBU-12 Paveway II
- Sudarshan laser-guided bomb
