= Tamang (surname) =

Tamang (Nepali: तामाङ) is a Nepalese surname.

Notable people with the surname include:

- Robin Tamang, Nepalese musician, and actor
- Ashika Tamang, Nepalese politician and social activist
- Binay Tamang, Indian politician, chairman of the Gorkhaland Territorial Administration (GTA)
- Buddhi Tamang, Nepalese actor
- Prashant Tamang, Indian singer
- Madan Tamang, Indian politician
- Devendra Tamang, Nepalese footballer
- Anju Tamang, Indian footballer
- Ananta Tamang, Nepalese footballer
- Prem Singh Tamang, Indian politician, founder of the Sikkim Krantikari Morcha (SKM)
- Shambu Tamang, Nepalese climber
- Bimala Tamang, Nepalese female karateka
- Ratnajit Tamang, Nepalese badminton player
- Gopal Tamang, Nepalese politician
- Harka Bahadur Tamang, Nepalese politician
- Maya Tamang, Nepalese women's rights activis
- Nima Tamang, Nepalese mountaineer
- Pasang Tamang, Nepalese social activist
- Sonam Tamang, Nepalese folk singer
- Tenzing Tamang, Nepalese footballer
- Pema Tamang, Indian social worker
- Dawa Tamang, Nepalese marathon runner
- Mingma Tamang, Nepalese rock musician
