= Sudarshan laser-guided bomb =

Sudarshan
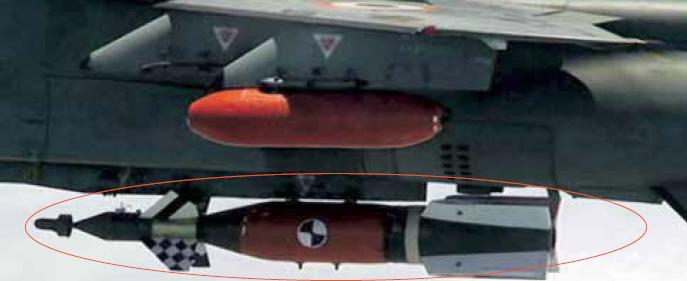
- Sudarshan laser-guided bomb
- Type: Laser guided bomb
- Place of origin: India

Service history
- In service: 2013
- Used by: Indian Air Force

Production history
- Designer: Aeronautical Development Establishment (DRDO); IIT Delhi
- Designed: 2006
- Manufacturer: Bharat Electronics
- Produced: 2013 – present
- No. built: 50+

Specifications
- Mass: 450 kg (990 lb)
- Effective firing range: 9,000 metres (9,800 yd)
- Guidance system: Beam riding
- Accuracy: 10 m CEP
- Launch platform: Dassault Mirage 2000; MiG-27 (retired); MiG-29; SEPECAT Jaguar; Su-30MKI; HAL Tejas

Sudarshan (Hindi: सुदर्शन “Krishna's Chakra”) is an Indian laser-guided bomb kit, developed by Aeronautical Development Establishment (ADE), a Defence Research and Development Organisation (DRDO) lab with technological support from another DRDO lab, Instruments Research and Development Establishment (IRDE), for the Indian Air Force (IAF).

== Background ==
Laser guided bombs were first developed by United States in 1960s. Later, Russia, France, and Britain also developed them. Laser-guided bombs are called "smart bombs" because they can follow a non-ballistic trajectory when laser designation of the intended target is done. A laser-guided bomb can hit its target with greater accuracy than ordinary dumb bombs. LGBs are manoeuvrable, free-fall weapons requiring no electronic interconnection to the aircraft. The bomb, once released by the aircraft, will seek the target and glide towards it using laser beam riding. The Sudarshan is India's first indigenous laser-guided bomb kit. It is designed to improve the accuracy of air-to-ground bombing by the IAF. All the necessary on-board components have been developed by Indian industries for this weapon package. The development of technology for producing laser guided bombs is part of the ongoing research in India towards achieving self-sufficiency in defense production.

== Design and development ==
The ADE won the project for developing an LGB in 2006. The project aimed to develop an advanced laser guidance kit for 450 kg (990 lb) class dumb bombs to improve their accuracy. The Sudarshan kit incorporates laser guidance developed by Aeronautical Development Establishment (ADE) for 450 kg (990 lb) bombs to improve the accuracy of a conventional bomb. The guidance consists of a computer control group (CCG), canards attached to the front of the warhead for steering and a wing assembly attached to the rear end to provide lift.

The guidance kits for beam riding and providing an accurate flight path have been fitted at the front and rear ends of the bomb. The laser-guidance seeker, fitted on the nose of the LGB is a very critical component, which was designed jointly by IIT Delhi and ADE, with Bharat Electronics Limited (BEL) as the lead production agency. A laser designator is used to mark a target. The on-board seeker detects the laser light reflected from the target and signals the kit's control surfaces to guide it towards the designated target. The seeker provides information on the deviation of the laser sport from the centre line of the detector. Sudarshan has an on-board flight-control computer with microelectronic-mechanical systems-based rate gyros. It also has high-precision linear ball-lead-screw actuators.

== Testing ==
The ADE had successfully designed, developed and carried out the user trials of laser-guided bomb kits with the participation of the IAF.

On January 21, 2010, it was reported that two flight trials had been conducted at the Integrated Test Range at Chandipur, Odisha, to test the effectiveness of the guidance and control systems of laser-guided bombs. The on-board systems in both the trials worked satisfactorily and had met the mission objectives. The test was conducted by pilots of the Indian Air Force, who flew the aircraft and released the bombs as per prescribed standard operating procedures.

On 9 June 2010, user trials of the laser-guided bomb kits were carried out at Pokhran test range with the participation of the IAF. Flight tests have demonstrated the accuracy, reliability and performance of these precision air-launched bombs. The tests were conducted after extensive simulation, design validation and ground experiments followed by series of flight evaluations.

== Performance ==
The kit can guide a bomb within 10 m CEP from its otherwise 400 m to 1000 m fall off the target. If dropped from normal altitude, it has a range of around 9 km. A program to extend the kit's capability to further increase its range using GPS is ongoing. It is expected to rival the GBU-16 Paveway II in performance.

The successful trials and flight tests in 2010 led ADE to further improve the bomb's accuracy. The Indian Air Force is upgrading a large number of unguided bombs to this standard based on the successful results. Sudarshan will be in service with the IAF bombers squadrons of MiG-27 and SEPECAT Jaguar. Also, several other fighters in the IAF could carry these bombs for the air-to-ground attack tasks like Su-30MKI, Mirage-2000 and MiG-29. It might also be used by the Indian Army for its long range artillery strike weapon and Indian Navy from an on-board launcher.

== Further development ==
ADE is developing a next-generation bomb (NG-LGB), which will address the problem of rolling of the bomb after its release. Its range will be increased to 50 km from the current glide-range of 9 km of Sudarshan, when dropped from normal altitude.

== Operators ==
=== India ===
- Indian Air Force - 50 Surdarshan bombs were ordered in January 2013.

== See also ==
- GBU-16 Paveway II
- Griffin LGB
- DRDO Glide Bombs
- DRDO SAAW
