= Kitolov-2M =

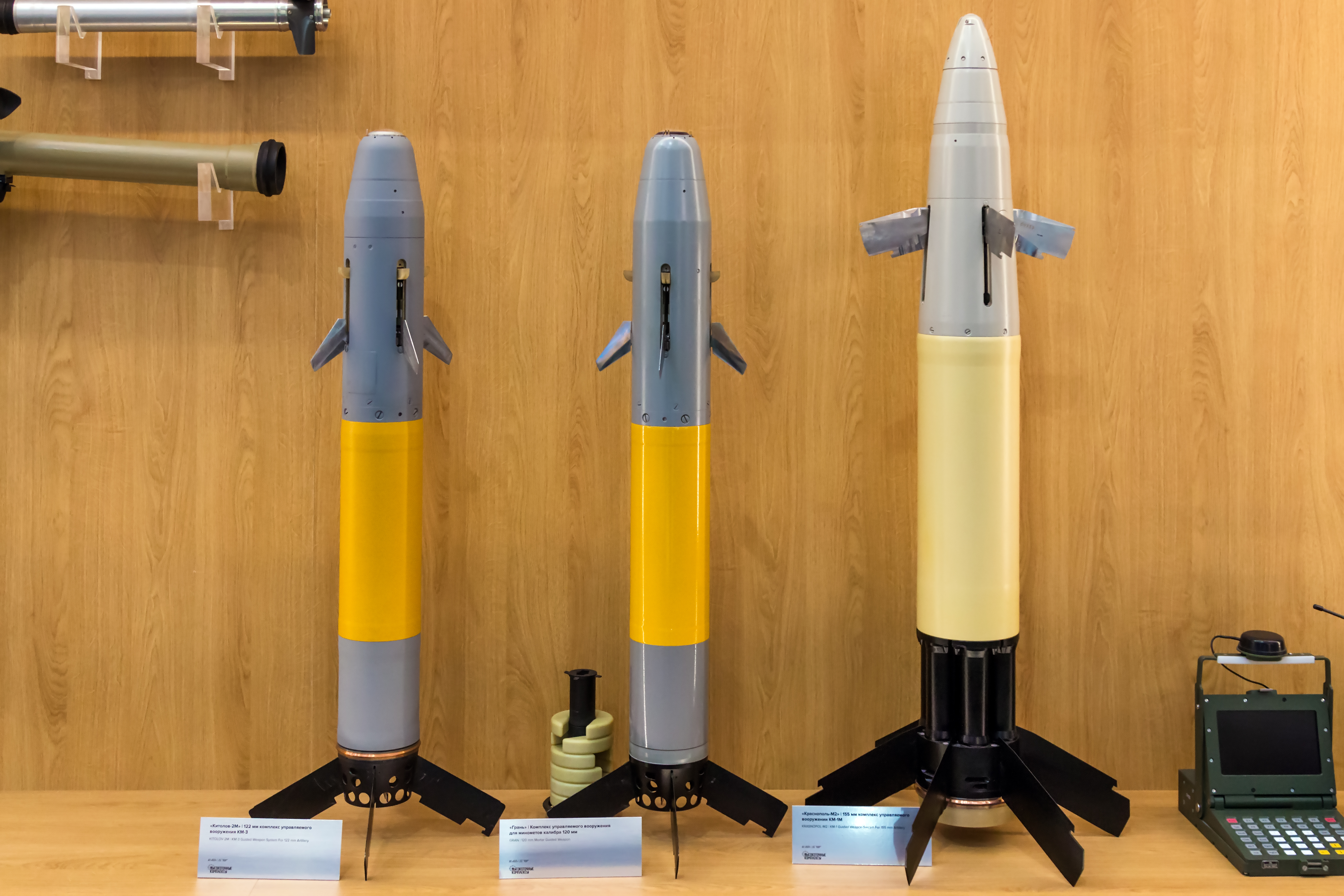
- From left to right: 122 mm (4.8 in) Kitolov-2M, 120 mm (4.7 in) Gran, and 152 mm (6.0 in) Krasnopol-M2.
- Type: Precision-guided artillery projectile
- Place of origin: Russian Federation

Service history
- In service: 2002
- Used by: Russian Federation
- Wars: Russo-Ukrainian War

Production history
- Manufacturer: KBP Instrument Design Bureau
- Produced: 2002–present
- Variants: Kitolov-2 (120 mm (4.7 in) mortar shell); Kitolov-2M (122 mm (4.8 in) howitzer shell); Krasnopol-M2 (152 mm (6.0 in) howitzer shell)

Specifications
- Mass: 28.3 kg (62 lb)
- Length: 1,190 mm (47 in)
- Caliber: 122 mm (4.8 in)
- Effective firing range: 12 km (7.5 mi)
- Warhead weight: 5.3 kg (12 lb)
- Guidance system: Semi-active laser homing

Kitolov, ("Китолов" - "Whale hunter") shells are Russian laser-guided mortar and howitzer shells with the Malakhit automated artillery fire control system, which is able to attack stationary and moving targets with a top attack mode. The 120 mm (4.7 in) mortar shell is called Kitolov-2, the 122 mm (4.8 in) howitzer shell Kitolov-2M, and the 152 mm (6.0 in) howitzer shell Krasnopol-M2 Several mortars using this system can fire simultaneously without interfering with each other, and the system is using common data for targets spaced at up to 300 m (330 yd).

== Users ==
- Russian Federation

== See also ==
- Krasnopol – (Russia, Soviet Union)
- KM-8 Gran – (Russia)
