= Israel Aerospace Industries Tamam Division =

The Tamam Division of the Systems Missiles and Space Group of the Israel Aerospace Industries (IAI) is a manufacturing plant in the development and production of high performance Inertial and Electro-Optic (EO) products and systems and maritime drones.

== TAMAM Division ==
Tamam, founded in 1964, is the inertial navigation design and development bureau in Israel specialising in gyro-stabilized electro-optical systems technology. Tamam's range of products have been used in combat, and are currently considered to be based on cutting edge technologies, used in airborne, space, land and marine applications worldwide.

== Inertial Navigation ==
- Inertial sensors (Gyroscopes, Accelerometers)
- Inertial Measuring Units (IMU)
- Inertial Navigation Systems (INS)
- GPS Aided Navigation Systems (INS/GPS)
- Artillery Navigation and Positioning Systems (AMAPS, VGLPS).
- Space Attitude Control Systems (Magnetometers, Magnetotorquers, Reaction/Momentum Wheels)

== Electro-optical Systems ==
- Stabilized electro-optical (EO) payloads (MicroPOP, MiniPOP, POP, MOSP, LOROS)
- Night Targeting Systems (NTS)
- Airborne Observation Systems (AOS)
- Site Security Observation Systems and Observation Vehicles (OWL, Giraffe)
