= Bofors STRIX =

Swedish endphase-guided 120 mm mortar projectile

Pansarsprängvinggranat m/94 STRIX is a Swedish endphase-guided projectile fired from a 120 mm mortar currently manufactured by Saab Bofors Dynamics.

STRIX is fired like a conventional mortar round. The round contains an infrared imaging sensor that it uses to guide itself onto any tank or armoured fighting vehicle in the vicinity where it lands. The seeker is designed to ignore targets that are already burning.

Launched from any 120 mm mortar, Strix has a normal range of up to 4.5 kilometres (2.8 mi). With the addition of a special sustainer motor, however, range can be increased to 7.5 kilometres (4.7 mi).

The Strix mortar round uses twelve midsection lateral thruster rockets to provide terminal course corrections.

The tail unit is loaded first with the necessary propelling charges (up to eight increments), then the sustainer motor (if required) and finally, the programmed projectile. A hand-held programming unit is connected to the projectile by cable prior to loading to feed in flight time before seeker activation, and with allowances for terminal phase ballistic conditions.

As well as being fired by conventional mortars, STRIX can be fired by the Advanced Mortar System, an automatic dual 120 mm mortar mounted in a turret for fitting to armoured fighting vehicles.

Feasibility and project definition studies began in 1983, as a joint private venture between FFV Ordnance and Saab Missiles. The first fully guided flight took place in 1988. FFV expected to complete development this year, and to receive a Swedish Army production contract shortly thereafter. The company reports considerable foreign interest, in particular from the US Marine Corps. STRIX has been in service with the Swedish and Swiss Armies since 1994.

== See also ==
- XM395 Precision Guided Mortar Munition – (United States)
- Bofors/Nexter Bonus – (Sweden, France)
- M982 Excalibur – (United States, Sweden)
- M712 Copperhead – (United States)
- Krasnopol – (Russia, Soviet Union)
