= KM-8 Gran =

Russian laser-guided 120 mm mortar projectile

KM-8 GRAN
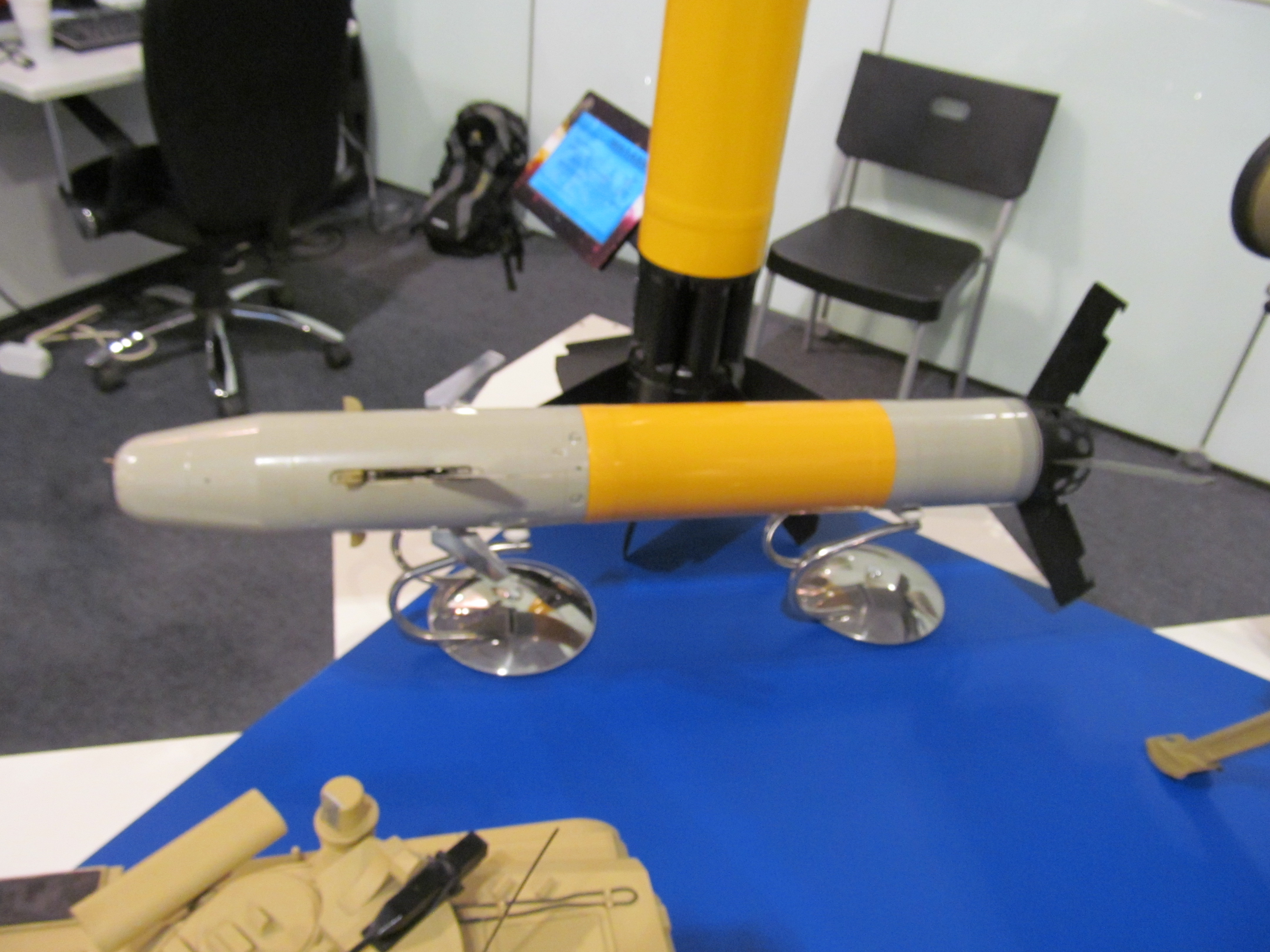
- Gran (artillery ammunition)
- Type: Precision-guided mortar projectile
- Place of origin: Russian Federation

Service history
- In service: 2022
- Used by: Russian Federation
- Wars: Russo-Ukrainian War

Production history
- Manufacturer: KBP Instrument Design Bureau
- Produced: 2022

Specifications
- Mass: 27 kg (60 lb)
- Length: 1,200 mm (47 in)
- Caliber: 120 mm
- Effective firing range: 1.5–9 km (0.93–5.59 mi)
- Warhead: Blast fragmentation
- Warhead weight: 5.3 kg (12 lb)
- Guidance system: Semi-active laser homing

KM-8 Gran, (КМ-8 "Грань" - "Borderline"), is a Russian 120mm guided mortar weapon system. It uses the Malakhit semi-active laser guidance fire control system to perform top attacks, and is able to attack moving and stationary targets.

Several mortars using this system can fire simultaneously without interfering with each other. The system uses common data for targets spaced at up to 300m. Gran projectiles can be fired from smoothbore and rifled mortars.

== See also ==
- Kitolov-2M – (Russia)
- Krasnopol – (Russia, Soviet Union)
