= KSTAM =

Smart munition

The Korean Smart Top-Attack Munition (KSTAM) is a smart munition intended to be launched from the gun of a main battle tank, namely the South Korean K2 Black Panther. Comparable systems include Diehl Corporation's Spear, DRDO SAMHO, CMI Defence and Luch Falarick 120, Israeli Aerospace Industries LAHAT, Nexter Systems Polynege, Alliant Techsystems STAFF and MRM-KE, Raytheon Technologies MRM-CE, and the two final companies' TERM.

There are two variations of KSTAM. KSTAM-I and KSTAM-II. KSTAM-I is modeled after IMI's 105 mm Excalibur top-attack munition, while KSTAM-II is modeled after SMArt 155's Sensor Fuzed Smart Munition (SFSM) developed by Diehl. While the two systems significantly differ from one another, their concept remains the same to defeat enemy armor by attacking their most vulnerable spot, the top.

== History ==
Not much is known about the KSTAM-I, other than the fact that It was based on the 105 mm Excalibur top-attack munition of the Israel Military Industries consisting of tandem warheads. It was to have a minimum range of 2.5 km with maximum being 5 km and the Muzzle velocity is 750 m/s.

It is speculated that the KSTAM-I has been abandoned in favor of KSTAM-II's higher capability, so the following article is largely concerned with KSTAM-II.

KSTAM-II was developed through technological cooperation between Poongsan and Diehl. It consists of Sensor Fuzed Smart Munition (SFSM) filled with EFP warheads. The KSTAM-II is launched from the 120 mm L55 main guns mounted on the K2 Black Panther main battle tanks that are to be fielded by the South Korean military, and will be used for attacking targets, stationary or moving, that are hidden behind obstacles.

Basically a guided anti-tank mortar munition, the KSTAM flies with the energy applied to it from the firing of the munition from the main gun. It does not possess any kind of propellants, and should not be confused as a missile or a rocket. The trajectory of the munition is curved, giving it a mortar- or artillery-like capability to strike targets taking cover behind obstacles. Its main use is to destroy entrenched and/or covered enemy vehicles that are unreachable with regular anti-tank shells due to the restrictions in terrain and/or hazards imposed upon the friendly vehicle.

== Design ==
KSTAM consists of sensor fuzed smart munition, flight stabilization wing assembly, and base detonation fuze. Sensor fuzed smart munition consists of an EFP warhead made of tantalum, a safety and loading device, a multimode sensor and signal processing system consisting of millimeter band radar and infrared, and a flight and descent stabilization system. In addition, KSTAM consists of multimode sensors that combine MMW sensors and Infrared sensors, enabling attacks on targets that move without being affected by bad weather and jamming.

The flight and descent stabilization system consists of a decelerating parachute and an autorotating parachute. The autorotating parachute is designed in a special canopy form through aerodynamic analysis to maintain a constant inclination angle, rotational speed, and descent speed when the sensor fuzed smart munition descents and search for targets. The sensor fuzed smart munition is separated from the wing assembly during flight at its highest altitude, the deceleration parachute deploys and descents at a speed of about 75 m/s. After the autorotating parachute is deployed, the sensor fuzed smart munition searches for the target while spirally descending at an inclination angle of 30 degrees, a rotation speed of 3 rps (180 rpm), and a descent speed of 13 m/s.

The warhead serves to penetrate the top of the target from a long distance after detonation. The material of the liner is tantalum and forms a penetrator under the pressure generated by the detonation of explosives. The explosively formed penetrator contains high kinetic energy, and after hitting the upper surface of the tank at a speed of about 2000 m/s, the lethal effect is maximized by "Behind armor fragmentation effect" in which not only the penetrator but also the inner armor of the tank destroyed by the penetrator forms fragments.

== Usage ==
The launch vehicle does not need to be revealed in order to use the munition, as the munition is equipped with its own navigation and targeting systems and gives it fire-and-forget capability. The vehicle can be completely hidden behind obstacles and still be able to launch the munitions as long as there is enough clearing for the barrel to elevate.

After being fired, the munition will begin its travel towards over the designated area, aided by four fins to stabilize its flight, where it would deploy its parachutes to slow its descent, giving its target-acquisition radar and infrared sensors enough time to identify and acquire a target, then fire its EFP at the top of it.

The munition can be manually controlled in a limited fashion by the launch vehicle using a live data link feed.

The minimum range of the munition is 2 km, while the maximum range is 8 km.

== Launch vehicle ==
The KSTAM is specifically designed for the CN08 120 mm guns mounted on the K2 Black Panther main battle tanks, and there are no other launch vehicles announced that are capable of firing such projectiles.
