= Basir =

Iranian laser-guided 155 mm artillery shell

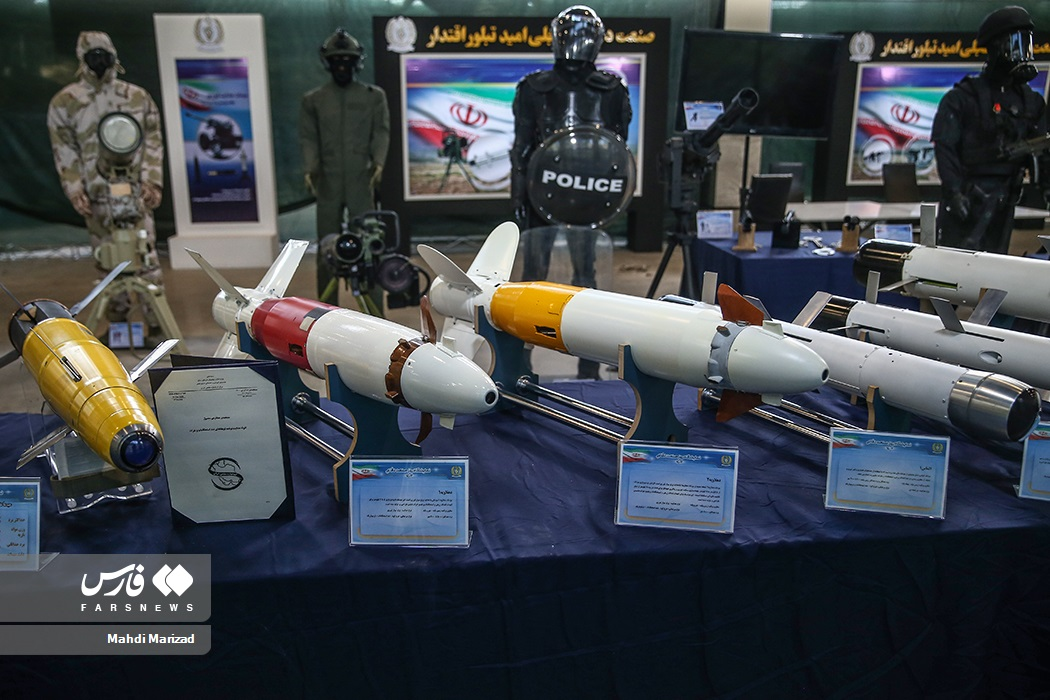
Basir shell on the far left in Yellow

Basir is an Iranian laser-guided, 155 mm high explosive artillery shell designed to destroy tanks, vehicles and other moving or non-moving targets with high precision.

These shells were unveiled on January 30, 2012, on the first day of the so-called "Daheye Fajr", a key point during the Islamic Revolution by defense minister Ahmad Vahidi. He later added that this system is very useful in mountainous areas.

Iranian TV showed some footage of the weapon being fired from an HM 41 howitzer at land and sea targets. It has a reported range of 20 km.

== Operators ==
- Iran

== See also ==
- List of military equipment manufactured in Iran
- HM 41 howitzer
