= Fire support =

Combat support provided to friendly forces directly in combat

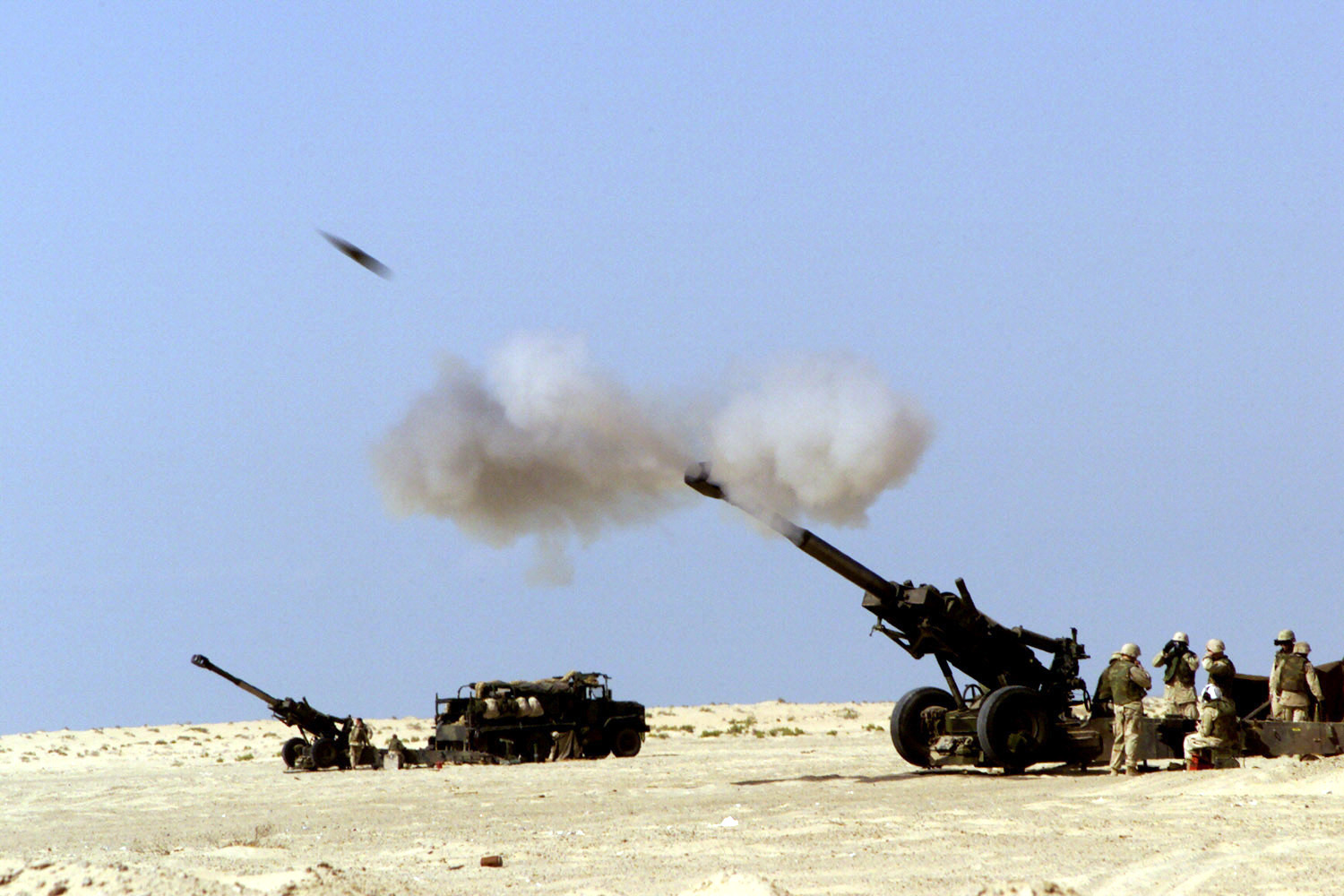
An M198 howitzer firing a 155 mm caliber shell to provide artillery fire support

Fire support is a military term used to describe the use of weapons and munitions aimed to support friendly forces by engaging, destroying or suppressing enemy forces, facilities, or materiel in combat. It is often provided through indirect fire (artillery) launched from the rear, though the term may also be used for some direct fire or aerial attacks (airstrikes) performed by front line units to support other friendly units.

The United States Department of Defense defines fire support as "fires that directly support land, maritime, amphibious, and special operations forces to engage enemy forces, combat formations, and facilities in pursuit of tactical and operational objectives."

== Overview ==
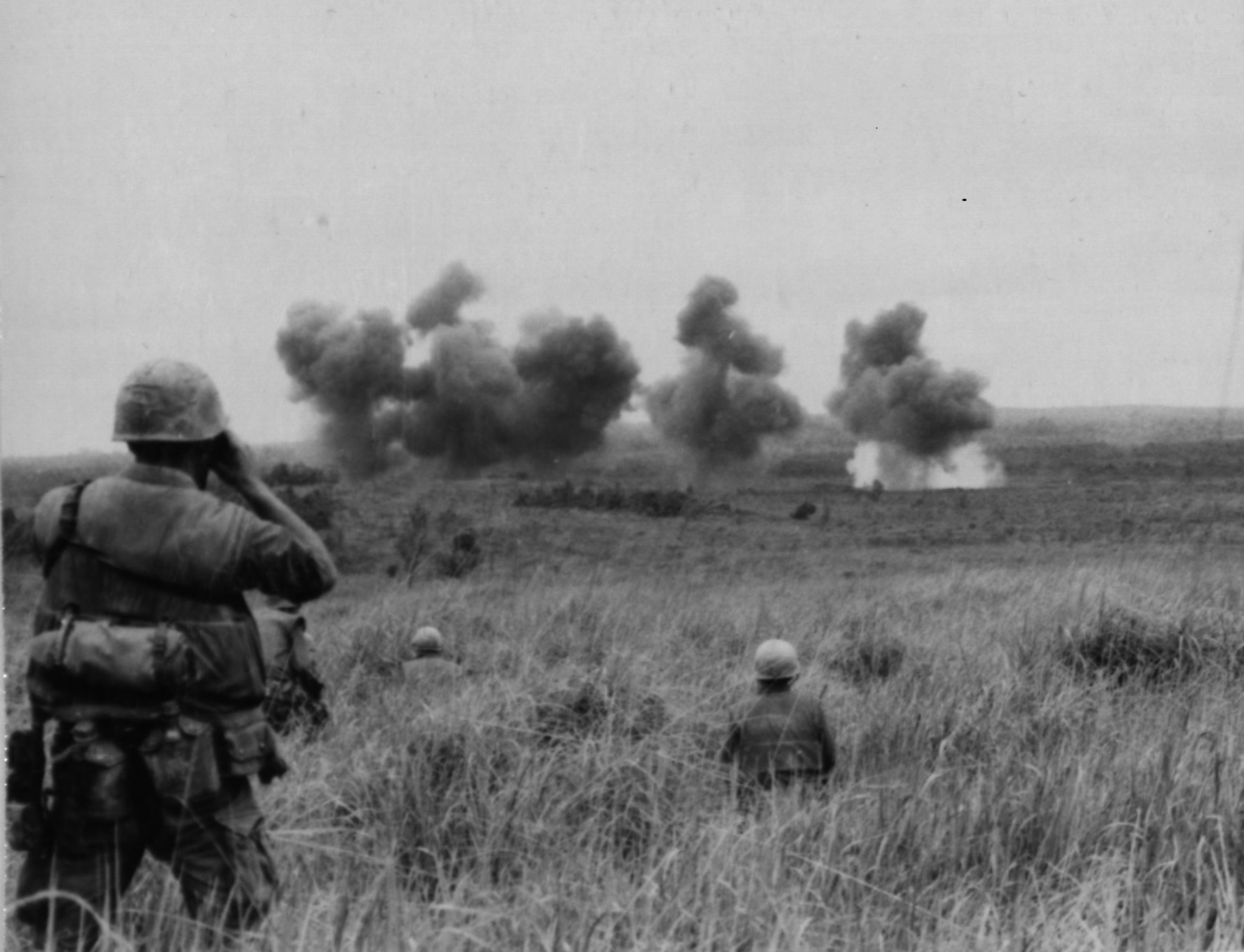
U.S. Marines watching the aftermath of an airstrike during Operation Prairie II of the Vietnam War

Fire support generally consists of fire from heavy or crew-served weaponry with high firepower, including strikes and barrages from artillery, mortars, rocket artillery, and missiles; naval gunfire support from naval artillery; airstrikes, strafes, and close air support from military aircraft; and drone strikes from unmanned combat aerial vehicles; among various other forms. Fire support is typically ordered and directed by an observer (e.g. artillery observer, forward air controller, etc.) on the front line, and provided by a weapon crew or operator in the rear, usually from a fortification, vehicle, or facility (such as a fire support base).

Fire support is used to support and supplement military units that may lack the capabilities or firepower offered by fire support. For example, an infantry unit needing heavy explosives to bombard an enemy emplacement, or a large smoke screen to cover their advance, and lacking the ability to do so themselves (e.g. insufficient effectiveness using grenades), may call for fire support from a capable nearby mortar unit.

Fire support can reduce friendly casualties whilst devastating enemy capabilities and morale. Effective use of fire support—as seen during the 2018 Battle of Khasham of the Syrian Civil War, where an outnumbered force used various forms of fire support to their advantage, avoiding serious casualties—may help swing a battle in one's favor.

=== Definition ===
Fire support is defined as "assistance to infantry and armored units by artillery fire, naval gunfire, and airplane strafing and bombing".

== History ==
Varying forms of fire support have existed since the advent of early cannons and rockets, which were used to bombard enemy positions and fortifications to support infantry. Warships have long provided fire support using their cannons. The use of fire support in its current form developed during World War I and World War II, when combined arms and advances in technology and tactics made fire support increasingly effective.

=== Early cannons (1300–1599) ===
Early versions of artillery included the Greek and Roman ballistas: essentially a large, mounted version of a crossbow that fired a single arrow. The first documented use of bombards (large mortars) in Europe was at the siege of Algeciras in 1343. By the 1470s, casting and metal work dramatically improved, giving way to the modern cannon. In the early 15th century, cast iron balls were invented for cannons. These balls, combined with gunpowder, were commonly used during sieges. By around 1550, the French had begun categorizing their guns by caliber, leading to a more organized formation of artillery.

=== Renaissance and revolutionary cannons (1600–1790) ===
Circa 1650, the French garrison gun was invented. The garrison gun was usually mounted and tied down to reduce recoil, and could be mounted in very small spaces. By the mid-18th century, artillery pieces were making an appearance in North America, most notably during the French and Indian War. Artillery was later used by the Americans in their War of Independence. The Continental Army used cannons captured at Fort Ticonderoga to win the Battle of Yorktown, the last major battle of the American Revolution.

=== Fire support during World War I and World War II (1914–1945) ===
During World War I, fire support was mostly used preemptively before an infantry attack. Artillery was often used to destroy enemy forces and positions, as well as obstacles in and near trenches. World War I also introduced chemical fire support to warfare, with the use of chemical compounds inside of shells in addition to conventional armaments.

During World War II, there was a joint usage of fire support by field artillery, naval fire support, and air support. Field artillery was mainly used in the Western and Eastern theaters, while naval fire support was used in the Pacific theater; however, a large number of ships were also used to give fire support on D-Day in France. There was significant use of aerial fire support during World War II, which included major improvements in technology in all theaters and campaigns.

=== Fire support in Vietnam (1955–1974) ===
During the Vietnam War, fire support was used to flush out Viet Cong positions. Most notably, napalm was used to destroy forests and jungles, resulting in less cover for the enemy.

=== Fire support in recent warfare (since 1975) ===
During Operation Desert Storm in Iraq, the United States used fire support, particularly onboard naval craft, to bombard positions. Combat drones were also introduced during this war as a way to provide fire support from the air without a manned aircraft. During Operation Desert Storm, artillery was used to achieve a decisive victory by coalition forces.

More recently, artillery has been used in the Russo-Ukrainian war to bombard troops and key positions. When the war first broke out, the United States sent artillery aid including shells, cannons, and Patriot missile defense systems to assist Ukraine. As of 2023, fire support by tanks and artillery have been used by the Israeli Defense Force to bombard key positions in the Gaza war against Hamas.

== Gallery ==
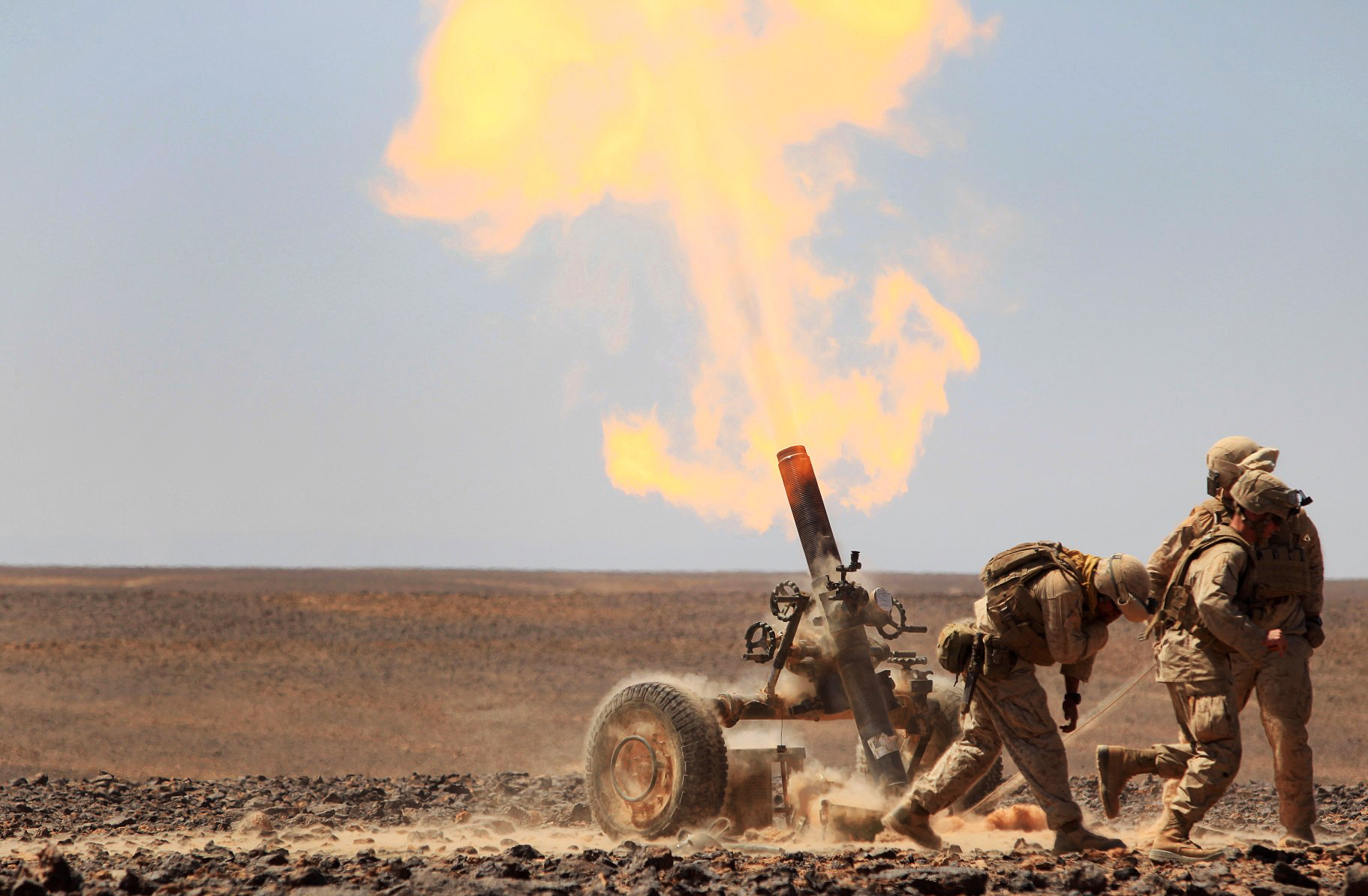
U.S. Marines firing a 120 mm shell from a 2R2M mortar

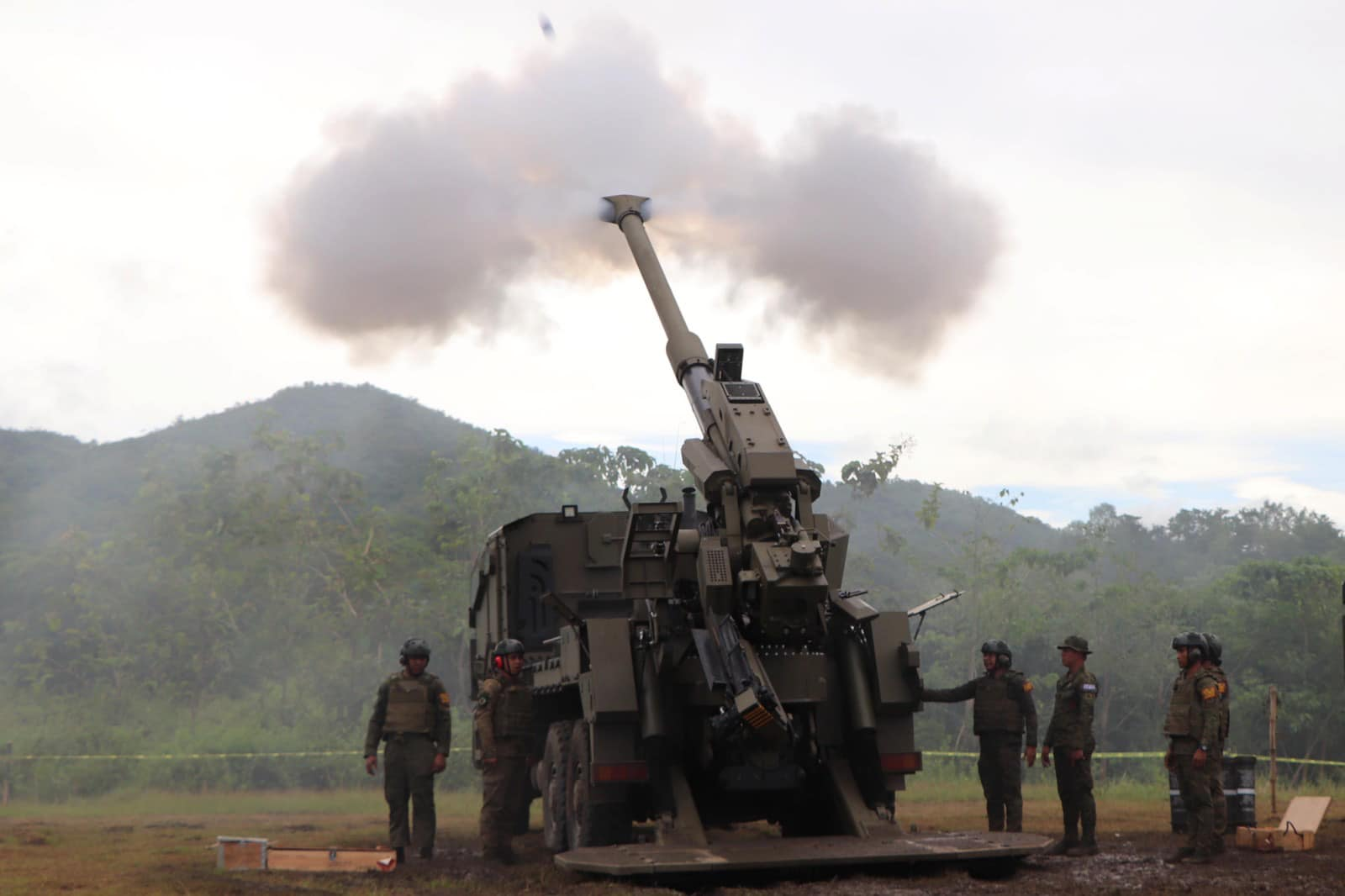
The crew of a Philippine Army ATMOS 2000 self-propelled artillery firing a 155 mm shell

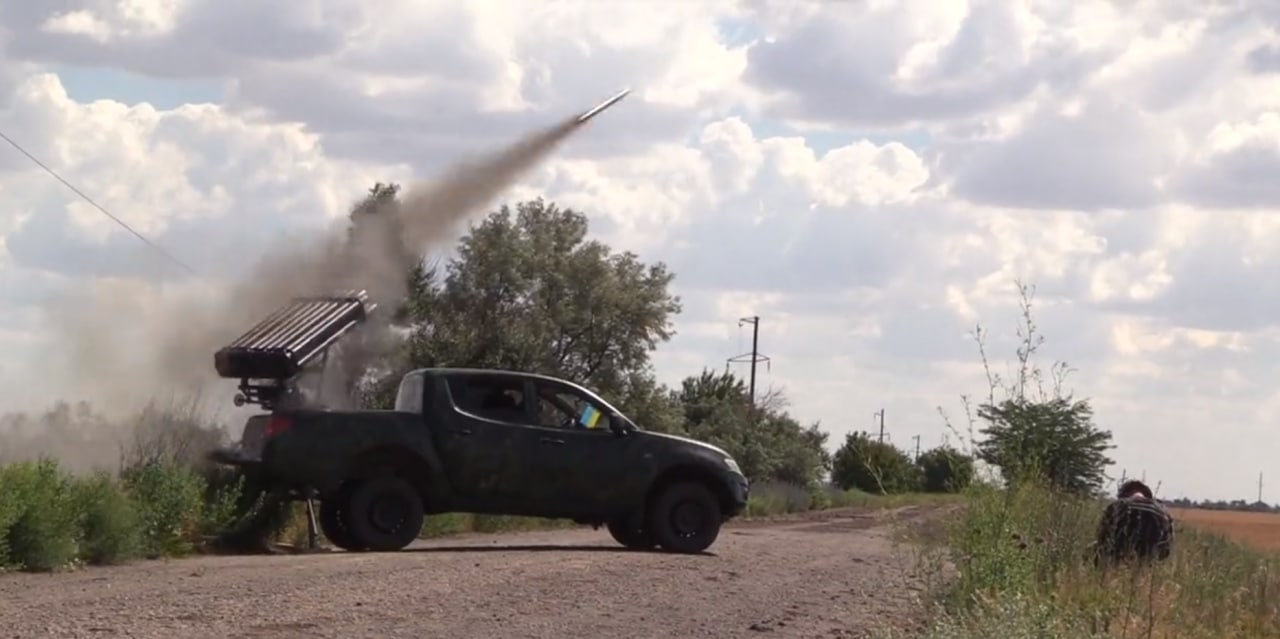
A Mitsubishi L200 technical used as a multiple rocket launcher by the Ukrainian Ground Forces

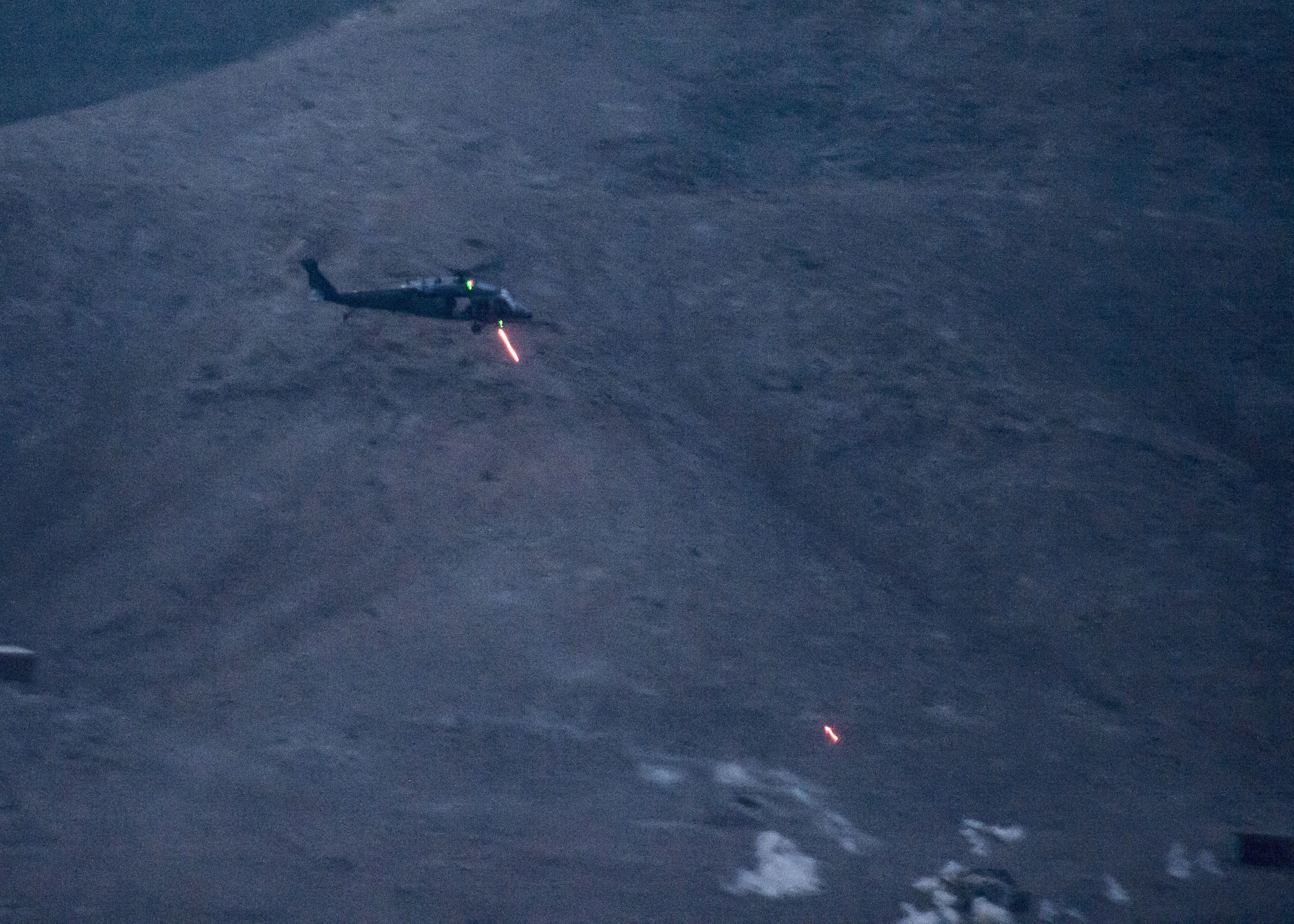
A UH-60 Black Hawk providing close air support using its side-mounted M134 Minigun turrets

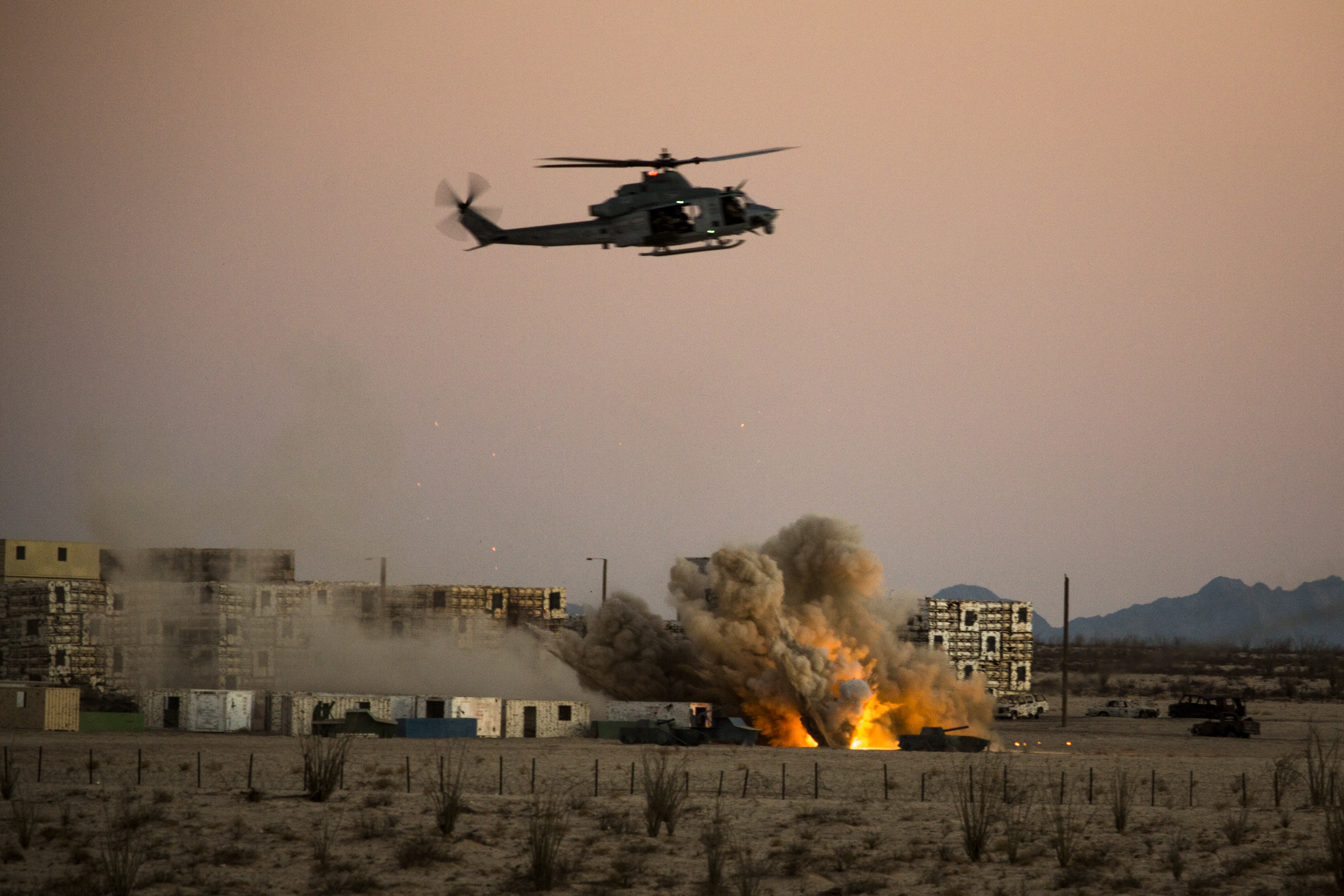
A UH-1Y Venom providing close air support during an urban warfare training exercise

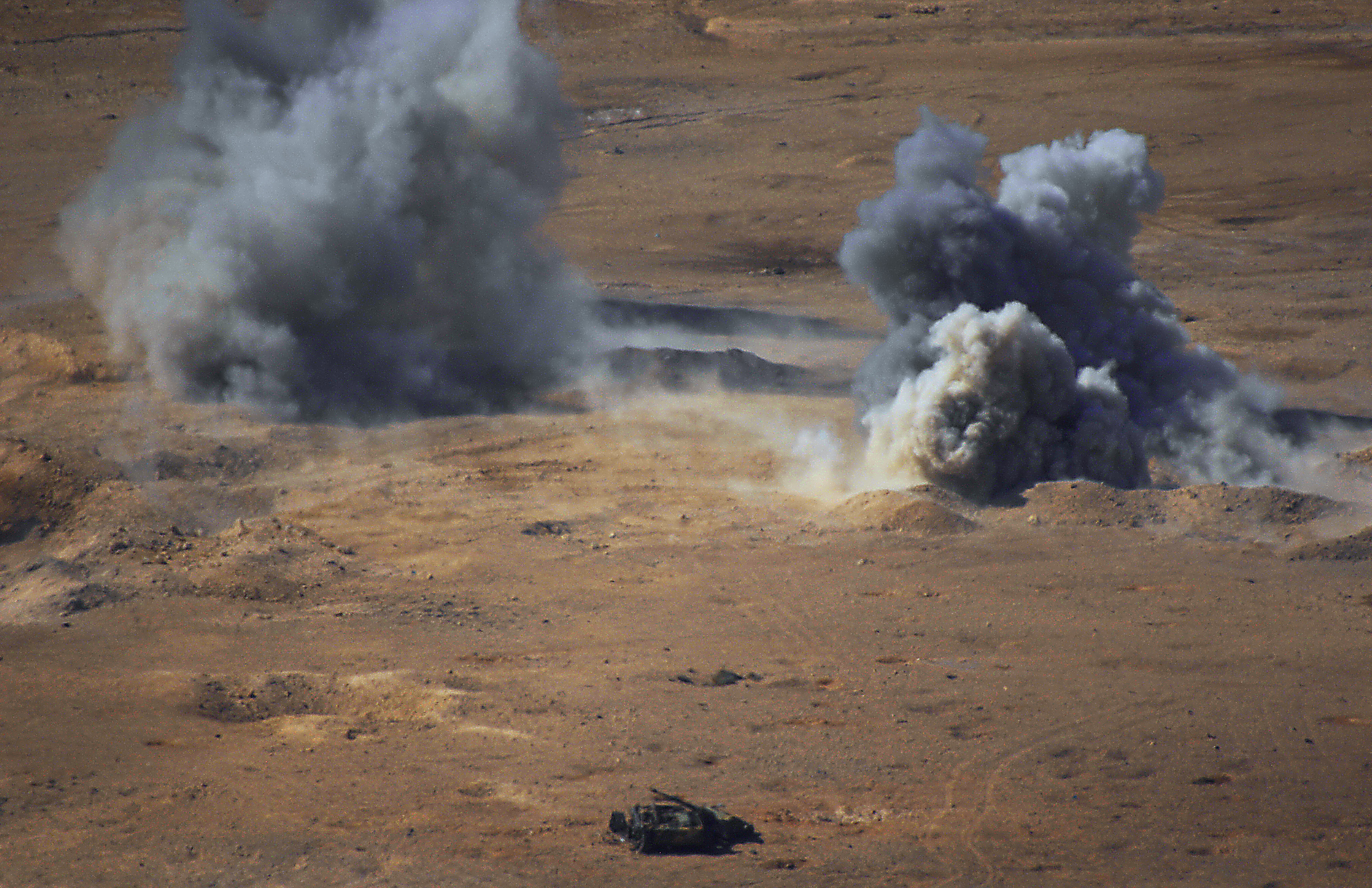
High explosive munitions fired by the USS Winston S. Churchill being used against target practice dummy tanks

== See also ==
- Fire support base
- Fire support team
