= Artillery observer =

Military role for observing artillery strikes and directing them to their targets

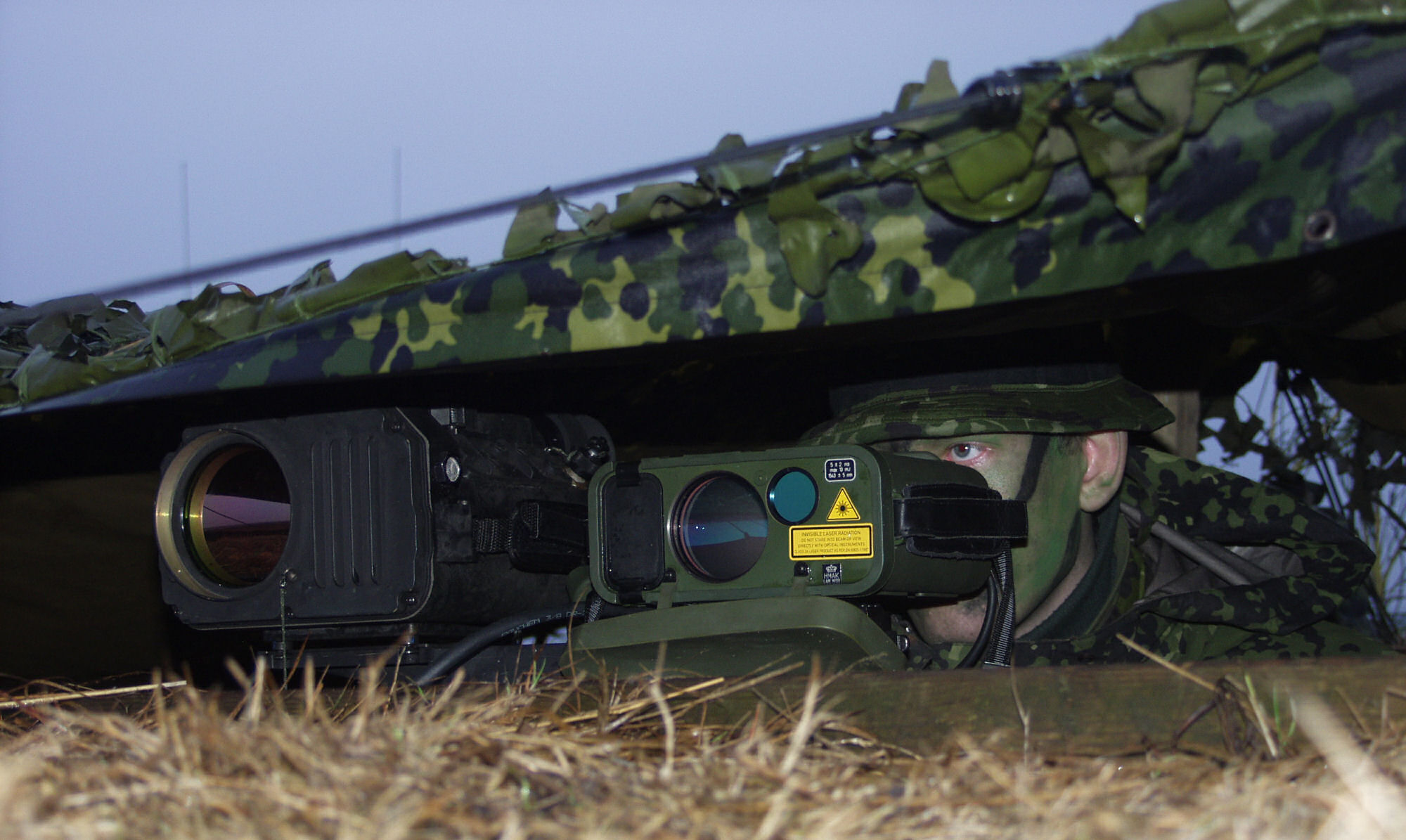
Danish Defence artillery observer using a thermal imaging camera and a laser rangefinder

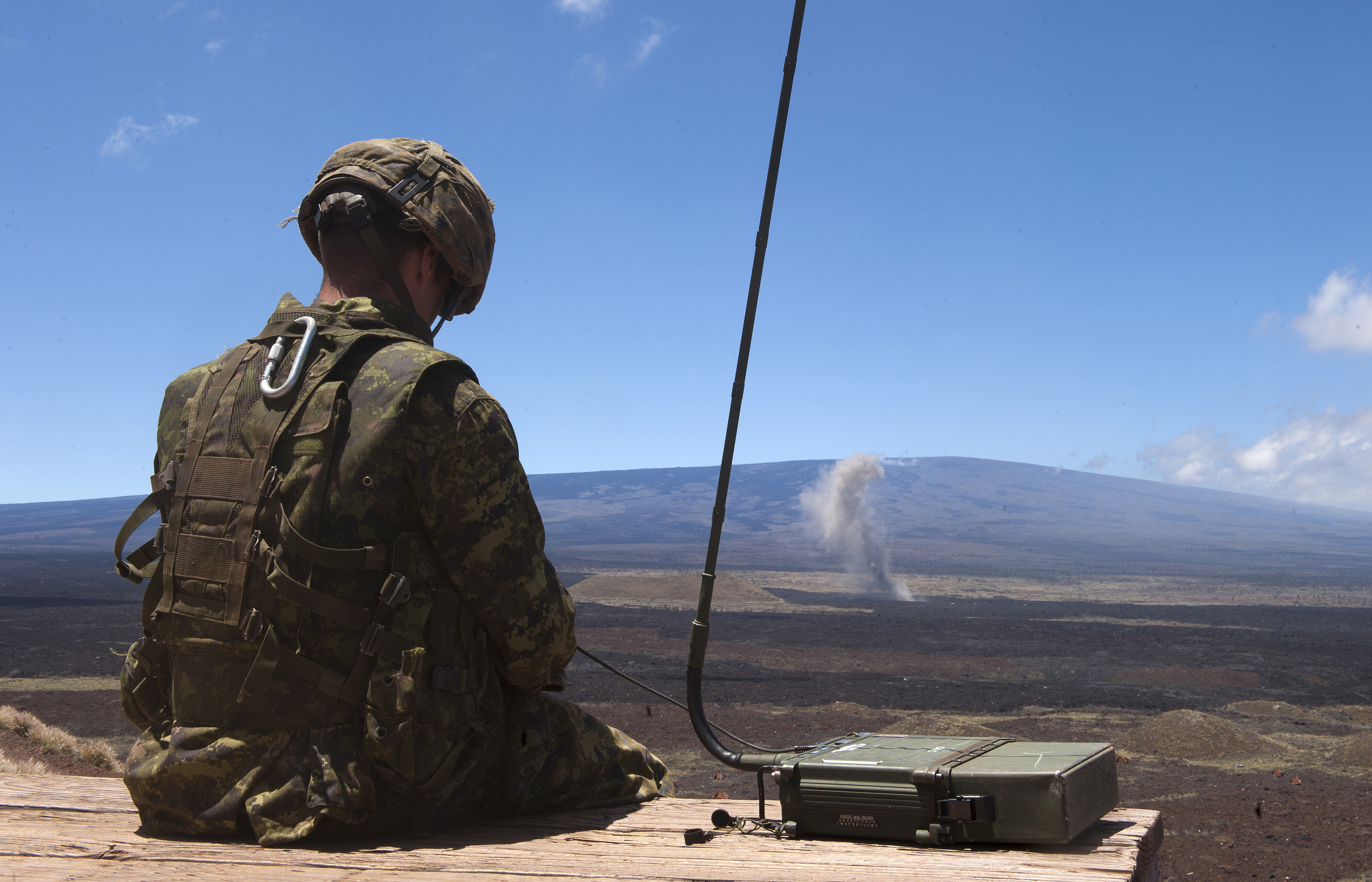
A Canadian Armed Forces artillery observer watching an artillery strike during a live fire exercise

An artillery observer, artillery spotter, or forward observer (FO) is a soldier responsible for directing artillery and mortar fire support onto a target. An artillery observer usually accompanies a tank or infantry unit. Spotters ensure that indirect fire hits targets which those at a fire support base cannot see.

== History ==
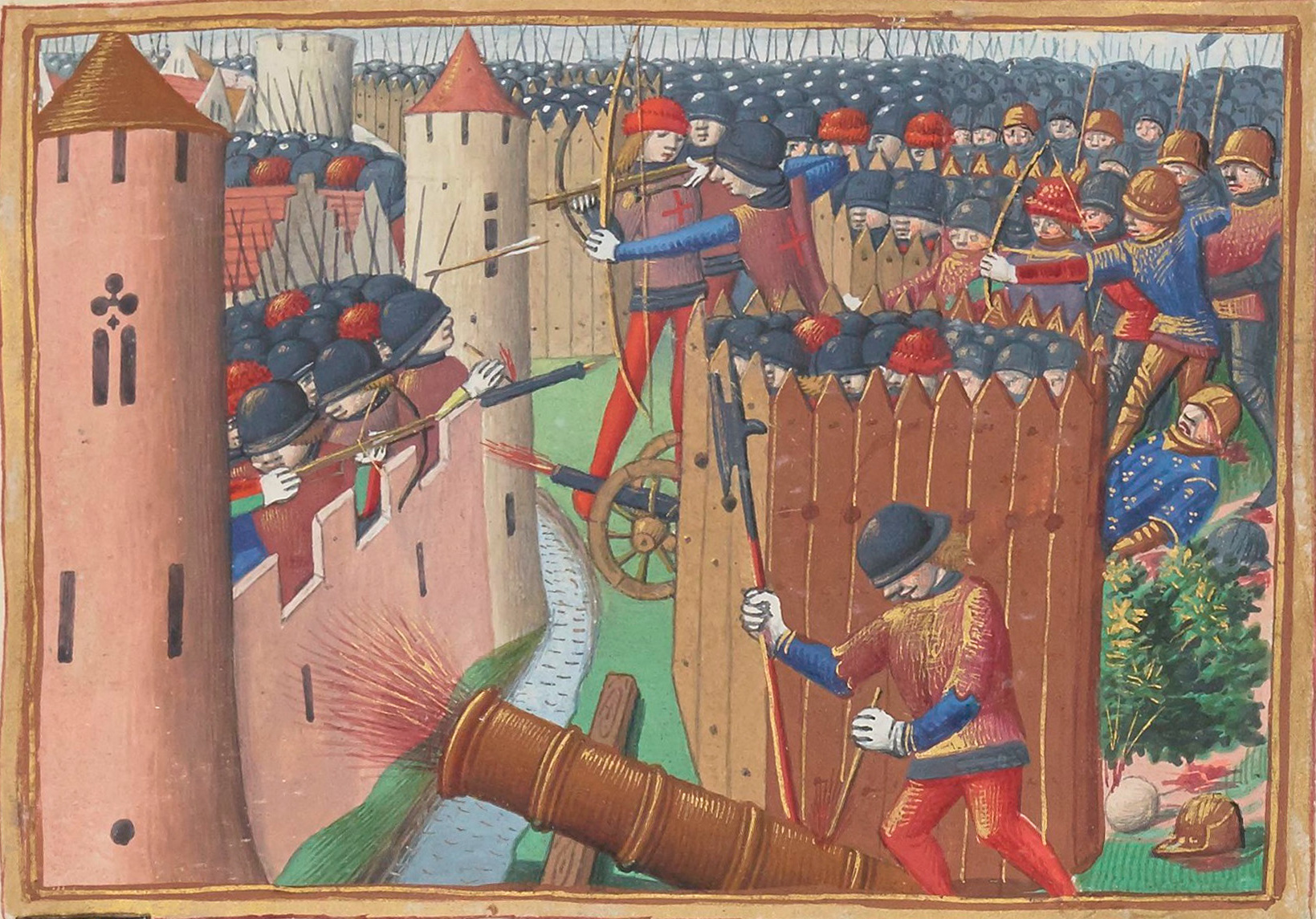
Medieval direct line-of-sight fire

Historically, the range of artillery steadily increased over the centuries. In the era of bombards or Steinbüchse, the gunner could usually still fire directly on the target by line-of-sight. As ranges increased, methods of employing indirect fire were developed. This made a forward observer essential in order to be able to use artillery effectively. The proximity of the observer to the target depended on the terrain and battlefield situation. Elevated observation posts could be used as an aid to facilitate communication between the guns and the observers. The development of optical and communication aids for observation advanced significantly in the First and Second World Wars. In the 21st century, Joint Tactical Fire Support observers emerged usually using sophisticated communications engineering systems.

== Description ==
Because artillery is an indirect fire weapon system, the guns are rarely in line-of-sight of their target, often located miles away. The observer serves as the eyes of the guns, by sending target locations and if necessary corrections to the fall of shot, usually by radio. Equipment used in the observer role ranges from binoculars to laser rangefinders to unmanned aerial vehicles. When attached to a special forces unit, an artillery observer is often tasked with coordinating fire from long-range artillery guns against high-value targets such as enemy headquarters. This is in contrast to an artillery observer's typical work with field/line artillery, which works in support of its own combat group. Such patrols may also form into 'stay behind' parties which deliberately hide in special observation hides as the main force fights a withdrawal.

Broadly, there are two very different approaches to artillery observation. Either the observer has command authority and orders fire, including the type and amount of ammunition to be fired, to batteries. Or the observer requests fire from an artillery headquarters at some level, which decides if fire will be provided, by which batteries, and the type and amount of ammunition to be provided. The first is characterized by the British, the second by the United States. In World War II both Germany and the Soviet Union tended towards the British method. In the British system, the observer sends a fire order to their own and any other batteries authorized to them, and may request fire from additional batteries. Each battery command post converts the fire orders into firing data for its own guns. Until post-World War II the observer would usually order actual firing data to the guns of their own troop, this was enabled by the use of calibrating sights on the guns.

In the U.S. system, the observer sends a request for fire, usually to their battalion or battery Fire Direction Center (FDC). The FDC then decides how much fire to permit and may request additional fire from a higher artillery headquarters. FDC(s) convert the observer's target information into firing data for the battery's weapons. The equivalent of an artillery observer for close air support is a forward air controller, while for the equivalent for naval gunfire support is a spotter. For general fire support, the position is known as a fire support specialist (FiSTer) or simply an observer.

== British Forward Observation Officer ==
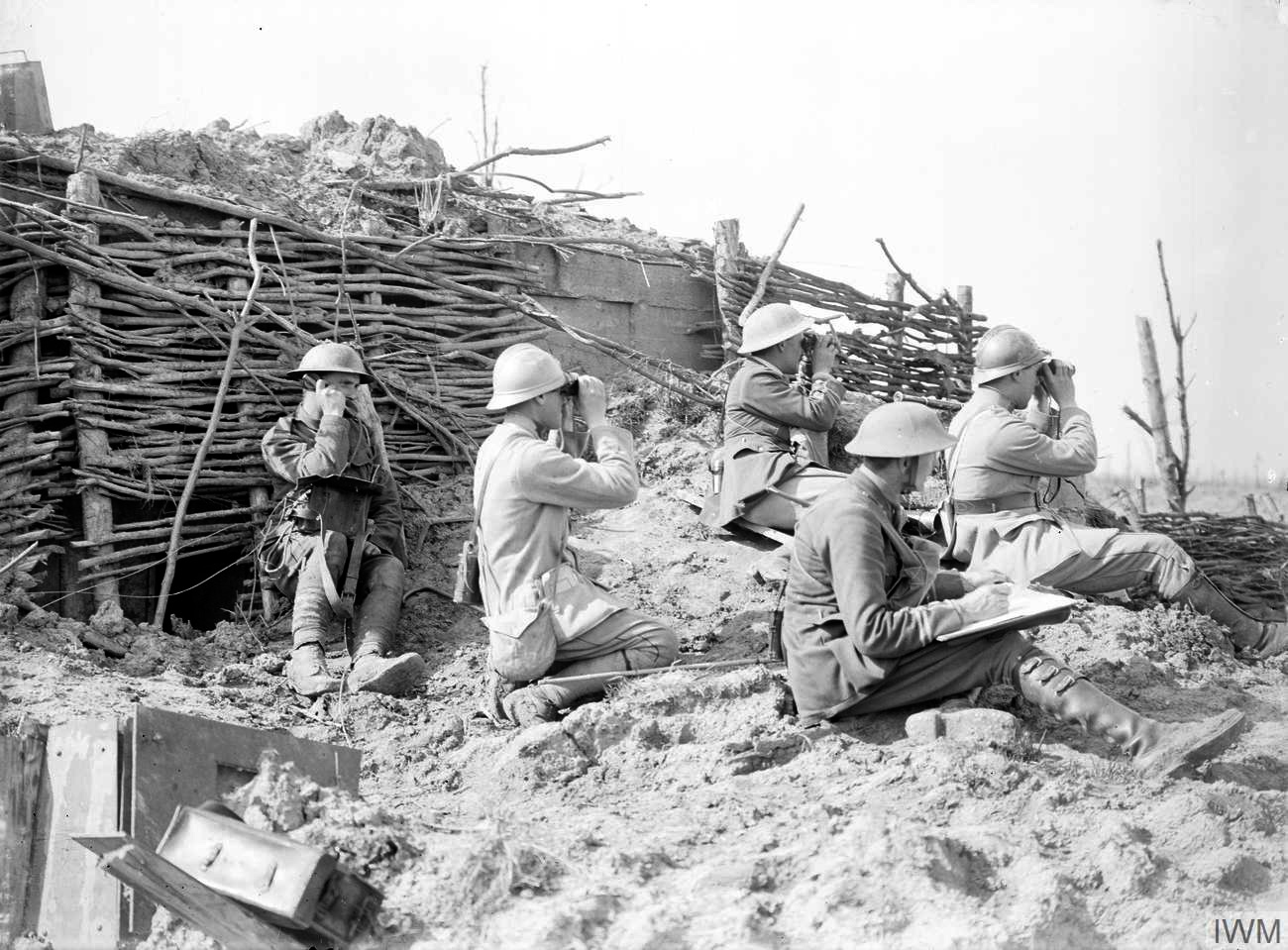
British and French artillery observers during the Battle of Langemarck, 1917

For centuries the Battery Commander had been responsible for controlling the fire of their battery. This continued with the introduction of indirect fire in the early years of the 20th Century. However, the First World War introduced 24 hour, seven days a week fighting. Furthermore, indirect fire had increased the distance between the guns and their targets, and between the observers and their guns. This led to the use of observing officers to act on behalf of the battery commander. In the 1938 re-organization of the Royal Artillery batteries were divided into troops, with the troop commanders (Captains) as observing officers at an (OP). These officers and their parties could operate as either as an Observation Post (OP) or accompany the supported arm (infantry or armour) as Forward Observation Officers (FOOs). During World War II it became the practice for close support battery commanders to become part of the tank regiment or infantry battalion headquarters they were supporting. They also started using 'quick fireplans' usually limited to their own regiment, to support fast moving limited battalion actions.

Generally FOOs were assigned to a company or squadron of a battalion or regiment that their battery was supporting. In the British artillery system FOOs were always authorized to order fire commands to their own troop or battery, based on their assessment of the tactical situation and if necessary liaison with the supported arm commander.

From mid World War II some artillery observers were authorized to order fire to all batteries of their regiment, it also became the practice for some observers to be designated 'Commander's Representative' able to order fire to a divisional or corps artillery. Unauthorized officers could request fire from more than their own battery. During that war it also became the practice that FOOs arranged quick fireplans comprising several coordinated targets engaged by guns and mortars to support short offensive actions by the squadron or company they were with.

In World War II OP/FOO parties were normally mounted in an armored carrier, although those assigned to support armored brigades usually had a tank – initially a Stuart but in NW Europe usually a Sherman. Tanks continued to be used by some observers until about 1975. In 2002 the British Army adopted the term Fire Support Team (FST) for its observation parties, including FACs under control of the artillery officer commanding the FST.

A functionally similar title is a mortar fire controller (MFC). An MFC is an infantry NCO who is part of their battalion's mortar platoon. He controls platoon's fire in the same way as an FOO. The introduction of FSTs places MFCs under tactical control of the FST commander.

Training, enabled by simulators, allows most soldiers to observe artillery fire, which has long been possible via a FOO.

== U.S. Army / U.S. Marine Corps ==
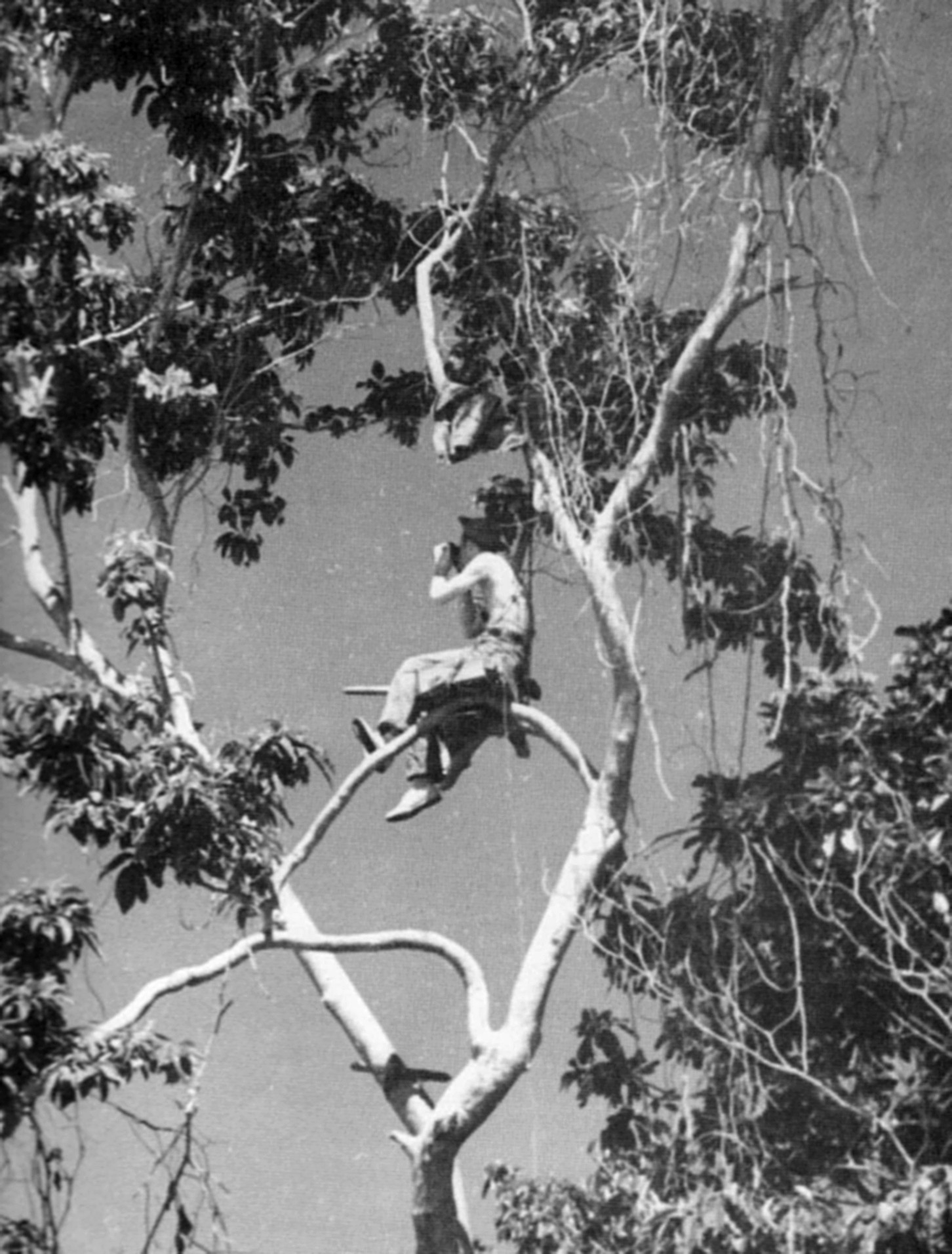
A U.S. Marine artillery forward observer in a tree to get a better view of the battlefield in Guadalcanal, 1942.

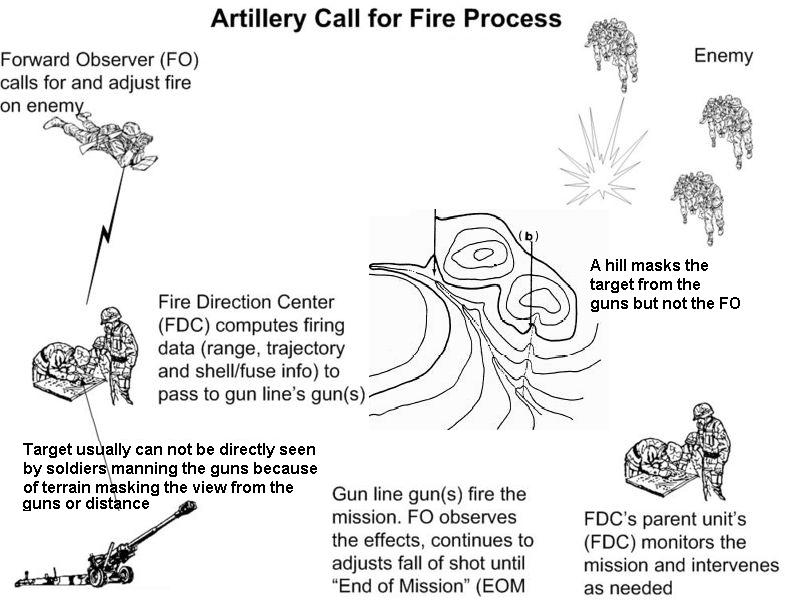
The process of an artillery observer calling for artillery fire

In the U.S. Army, a Light, Heavy, or Stryker Infantry company Fire Support Team (FIST) consists of a Fire Support Officer (FSO), a Fire Support Sergeant, three Forward Observers (FO), two Fire Support Specialists and three Radio Telephone Operators (RTO). Armored/Cavalry FIST teams usually consist of just one FSO and three enlisted personnel. Brigade COLT teams operate in groups of two individuals, a Fire support specialist in the grade of E-1 to E-4 and a Fire Support Sergeant in the grade of E-5. Currently in unit training is beginning to incorporate more close air support and close combat attack missions into the fire support team's mission.

In the U.S. Marine Corps, scout observers also act as naval gunfire spotters and call for, observe and adjust artillery and naval gunfire support, and coordinate fire support assets to include mortars, rockets, artillery, NSFS and CAS/CIFS. A rifle company Fire Support Team typically consists of a Fire Support Officer (FSO), Forward Air Controller (FAC) or Joint Terminal Attack Controller (JTAC), two scout observers (FO), and two radio operators (RO). In Weapons Company, the Fire Support Coordination Center (FSCC) determines fire support asset allocation to each rifle company FiST, and supervises the planning and execution of each FiST's fire support plan. Key players in the FSCC include the Fire Support Coordinator (FSC), Battalion Fire Support Officer (FSO), and Battalion Air Officer (Air-O).

== Air observation post ==
The Royal Flying Corps and Royal Air Force had been responsible reporting targets and observation of fire in World War I, this role was subsequently called 'Arty/R, but proved difficult from high performance aircraft over hostile territory in World War II. In 1940 it was agreed that RAF AOP squadrons equipped with light aircraft, operating at low altitude over friendly territory and flown by Royal Artillery officers would be formed. These squadrons existed until the formation of the Army Air Corps in 1957.

== Use of unmanned aerial vehicles ==
Since the development of small unmanned aerial vehicles, they have been used for identifying targets, spotting fall of shot, and correcting aim. Operators are usually relatively close to the target, behind enemy lines, and subject to attack.

== See also ==
- Field artillery (United States)
- Fire support team
- Forward air control
- Observation balloon
