= Aiming point =

Variable in aiming a weapon

In field artillery, the accuracy of indirect fire depends on the use of aiming points. In air force terminology the aiming point (or A.P.) refers to holding the intersection of the cross hairs on a bombsight when fixed at a specific target.

An indirect fire aiming point provides a point of angular reference to aim a gun in the required horizontal direction – azimuth. Until the 1980s aiming points were essential for indirect fire artillery. They are also used by mortars and machine guns firing indirectly.

== Description ==
An essential requirement of an aiming point is that it be at a sufficient distance from the gun using it. The reason for this is that, while firing, guns, particularly towed guns, move back a short distance – perhaps a foot, as their spades embed and may move more in soft ground. When they traverse their barrels their sights also move because they are not at the point of pivot. All this means that if the aiming point is too close then the angle to the aiming point changes. This aims the guns off-target, possibly up to several hundred meters.

For gun-laying purposes a distance of a few kilometers from gun to aiming point is sufficient. An aiming point would be a sharply defined and easily distinguished feature, such the edge of an obvious building. However, this presents problems in featureless areas, in bad visibility or at night and putting lights on distant aiming points is seldom practical. Therefore, methods of simulating a distant aiming point are required.

== History ==
The earliest form of aiming point was a pair of aiming posts for each gun, almost in line with one another when viewed through the gun's sight, and placed about 50 m (160 ft) from the gun. There were at least two ways of using these, but the simplest is to aim the sight midway between them.

Before the First World War the French introduced the collimateur. During that war the British introduced their first paralloscope, which was a horizontal mirror placed a few feet from the gun; the layer aimed his sight at its reflection. In the 1950s, the parallescope was replaced by the prism parallescope that was more robust and easily positioned. In the 1970s, the US introduced a modern version of the French device and called it a collimator. In the same period infra-red beacons had some very limited use.

In some special circumstances, such as when only one round or salvo was going to be fired (e.g. by nuclear artillery or a multiple rocket launcher), a director or aiming circle about 100 m (330 ft) away could be used as an aiming point.

== Related matters ==
Originally, when indirect fire was introduced, an aiming point (AP) was used as a quick means of orienting the guns by ordering an angle to the AP for all guns to use. Other aiming points were used for aiming while firing, initially called ‘supplementary aiming points’ were given the name ‘Gun Aiming Points’ (GAP). Many armies required that each gun recorded several GAPs, some mounted recording plates on their guns where the GAP angles were written, and some had regulations giving the priority order for the use of different types of GAP.

In the 1980s the US Multi-Launch Rocket System entered US service, this did not use GAPs because it had a gyroscopic orientation system and did not need external reference points or orientation. During the 1990s similar systems were adopted by M109 Paladin, AS90 and Panzerhaubitze 2000, and subsequently they were adopted for towed guns, notably UK's 105mm L118 Light Guns.

== See also ==
- Gun laying
- Milliradian
- Rangefinder
