= Prism paralleloscope =

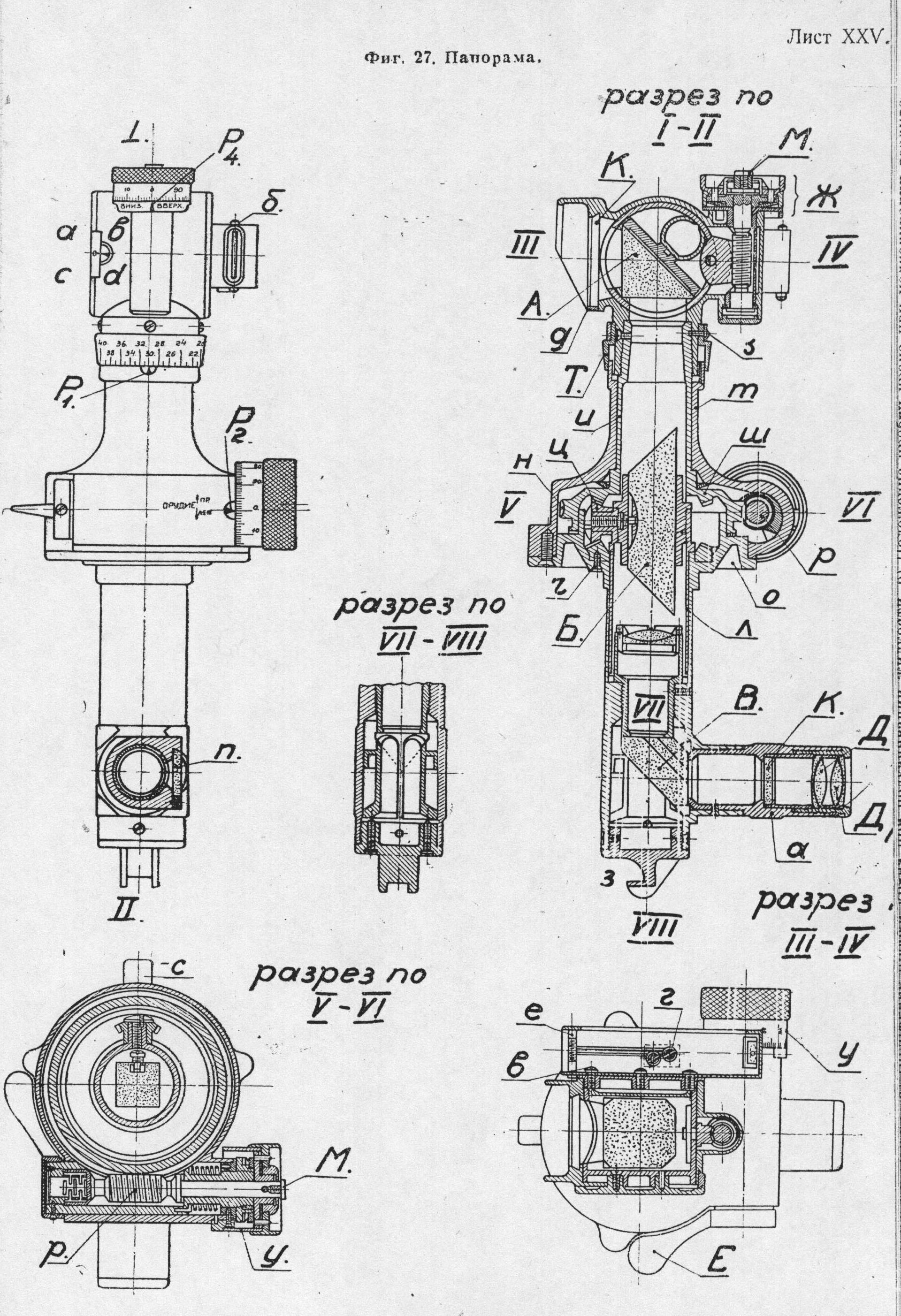

A prism paralleloscope is a standard piece kit used by artillery units as a gun aiming point. It is a type of paralleloscope that uses a prism instead of a plain mirror. Its purpose was to function as an aiming point in the horizontal plane when laying for indirect fire artillery.

== Description ==
The prism paralleloscope entered service with the British Army in the late 1950s. It was permanently fitted in a fibre-glass case with a lid. This case was mounted on two short metal vertical poles so that it was about 2 ft (0.6 m) above the ground, these vertical poles were held together by two horizontal rods slightly shorter than the paralleloscope case. Once mounted the lid of the case provided a 'canopy' above the paralleloscope.

Paralleloscopes entered British service in the 1920s-1930s. These early versions were a mirror about 3 ft (0.9 m) long and 4 in (100 mm) wide, mounted on a tripod about 3 ft (0.9 m) high and positioned a few yards (or meters) away from and to the side of a gun on its dial sight side. Each gun in a battery had at least one. When a gun was oriented in its centre of arc it recorded the paralleloscope as one of its aiming points (other types of aiming point were a distinctive distant topographical feature or a pair of aiming posts).

With a paralleloscope the gun layer set the zero line deflection or bearing of fire on his dial sight and aimed his sight at its reflection in the paralleloscope. As the gun fire and its trail(s) bedded in and the gun moved back, the reflected image of the sight moved along the paralleloscope. It was particularly useful at night because it removed the need for aiming points with lights attached to them. If the gun had a very wide arc of fire then more than one paralleloscope was required for each gun.
