= Fire support team =

A fire support team (FST) is a British Army unit responsible for directing artillery fire and close air support (ground attack by attack aircraft) onto enemy positions. The term FST replaced the previous name of Forward Observation Party and reflects the inclusion of fires other than artillery into their control.

The FST can comprise six people:

- A FST Commander
- The Team 2IC (second in command) - known as an Ack.
- A Forward Air Controller to terminally control Close Air Support (CAS) and manage airspace.
- Signallers
- Drivers
