= Ballistic impact =

Ballistic impact is an impactful collision by a high-velocity projectile on another (usually much more massive) object, such as a bullet or arrow hitting a shooting target, a throw-up gravel from a road or runway hitting a windscreen, a boulder hurled by a trebuchet hitting a city wall, or a shell/missile striking a military vehicle. The location on the recipient object (target) where the collision has occurred is often called the point of impact, and the destructive effects exerted on the target by the collision is called the projectile's terminal ballistics.

The simulation of ballistic impacts can be achieved with a light-gas gun or other ballistic launcher. It is important to study the response of materials to ballistic impact loads. Applications of this research include body armor, armored vehicles and fortified buildings, as well as the protection of essential equipment, such as the jet engines of an airliner.

== See also ==
- Impact (mechanics)
- Shot grouping
