= Forward air control =

Direction of close air support

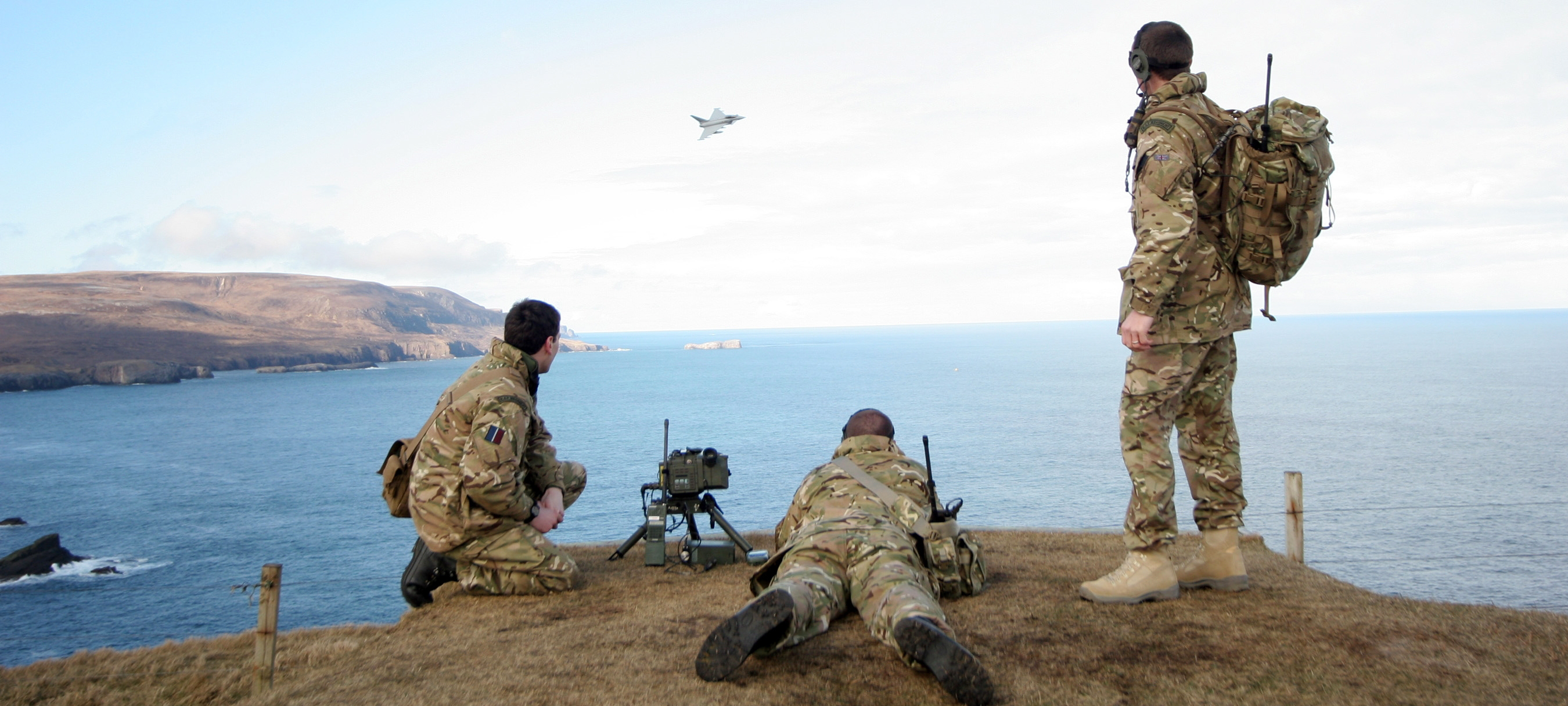
RAF Regiment Forward Air Controllers from the Air Land Integration Cell, based at RAF Coningsby, guide a Typhoon from 6 Squadron onto their target at the Cape Wrath practice range in Scotland.

Forward air control is the provision of guidance to close air support (CAS) aircraft intended to ensure that their attack hits the intended target and does not injure friendly troops. This task is carried out by a forward air controller (FAC).

A primary forward air control function is ensuring the safety of friendly troops during close air support. Enemy targets in the front line ("Forward Edge of the Battle Area" in US terminology) are often close to friendly forces and therefore friendly forces are at risk of friendly fire through proximity during air attack. The danger is twofold: the bombing pilot cannot identify the target clearly, and is not aware of the locations of friendly forces. Camouflage, a constantly changing situation and the fog of war all increase the risk. Present day doctrine holds that Forward Air Controllers (FACs) are not needed for air interdiction, although there has been such use of FACs in the past.

An additional concern of forward air controllers is the avoidance of harm to noncombatants in the strike area.

== Early air ground support efforts ==
As close air support began during World War I, there were pioneer attempts to direct the trench strafing by the ground troops marking their positions by laying out signal panels on the ground, firing flares, or lighting smoke signals. Aircrews had difficulty communicating with the ground troops; they would drop messages or use messenger pigeons. Benno Fiala von Fernbrugg, an Austro-Hungarian pilot, pioneered the use of radio for fire control; at the Battle of Gorlice he used a radio transmitter in his airplane to send changes via morse code to an artillery battery on the ground. Colonel Billy Mitchell also equipped his Spad XVI command airplane with a radio, and the Germans experimented with radios in their Junkers J.I all-metal-structure, armored-fuselage sesquiplanes.

The Marines in the so-called Banana Wars of the 1920s and 1930s used Curtiss Falcons and Vought Corsairs that were equipped with radios powered by airstream-driven generators, with a range of up to 50 miles. Another method of communication was for the pilot to drop messages in a weighted container, and to swoop in and pick up messages hung out by ground troops on a "clothesline" between poles. The objective was aerial reconnaissance and air attack. Using these various methods, the Marine pilots combined the functions of both FAC and strike aircraft, as they carried out their own air attacks on the Sandinistas in Nicaragua in 1927. The commonality of pilots and ground troops belonging to the same service led to a close air support role similar to that sought by use of FACs, without the actual use of a FAC. On 27 October 1927, a Marine patrol used cloth panels to direct an air strike—arguably the first forward air control mission. This distinctive U.S. Marine doctrine of interaction between Marine infantry and aviation would persist, recurring in the Korean War and the Vietnam War.

French colonial operations in the Rif War from 1920–1926 used air power similarly to the Marines in Nicaragua against the Sandinistas but in a different environment, the desert. The French Mobile Groups of combined arms not only used aircraft for scouting and air attack; the airplanes carried trained artillery officers as observers. These aerial observers called in artillery fire via radio.

The German military noted close air support operations in the Spanish Civil War and decided to develop its forward air control capability. By 1939, they had forward air control teams called Ground Attack Teams attached to every headquarters from regiment level upwards. These Teams directed air strikes flown by Luftwaffe close air support units. Extensive coordinated training by air and ground troops had raised this system to state of the art by the beginning of World War II.

When the United States Army Air Forces (USAAF) was founded on 20 June 1941, it included provisions for Air Ground Control Parties to serve with the United States Army at the division, corps, and Army headquarters. The Air Ground Control Parties functions were to regulate bombing and artillery in close conjunction with the ground troops, as well as assess bomb damage. They were thus the first of similar units to try to fulfill the functions of the FAC without being airborne. However, these units were often plagued by turf wars and cumbersome communications between the respective armies and air forces involved. As a result, it could take hours for an air strike requested by ground troops to actually show up.

== World War II ==
However, forward air control during World War II came into existence as a result of exigency, and was used in several theaters of World War II. Its reincarnation in action was a result of field expedience rather than planned operations.

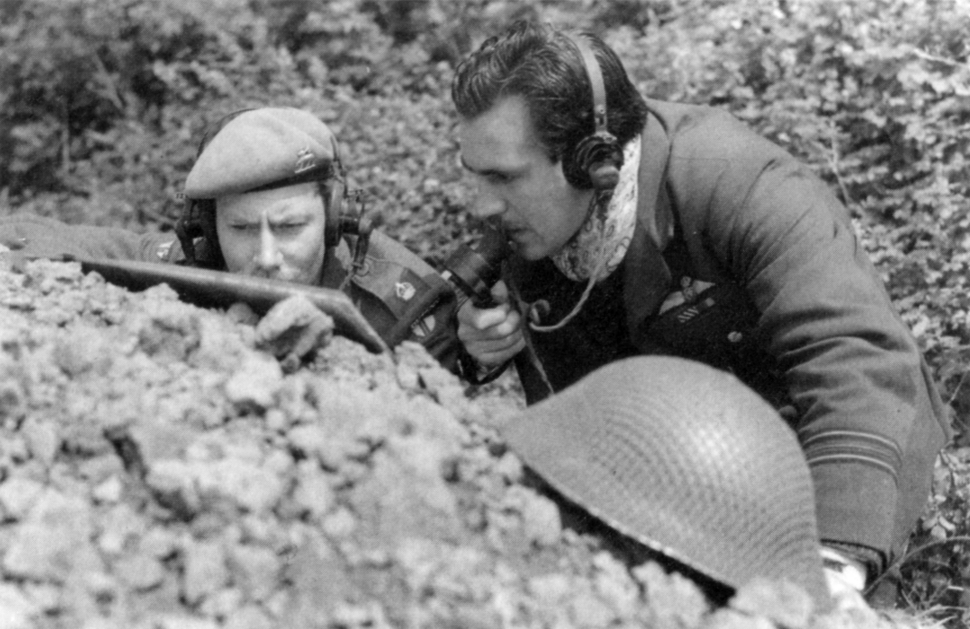
British Mobile Fighter Controllers operating in North Africa during World War II

On the Allied side, British forces in the North Africa campaign began using the Forward Air Support Links, a "tentacle" system that used radio links from front line units to the rear. Air force teams were co-located with the army command. Close air support would be requested by forward units and if approved delivered from "cab ranks" of fighter-bombers held near the front lines. The requesting unit would direct the air strikes. The U.S. Army would not copy the British system until the Allied invasion of Italy, but adapted it for use there and in France after the Invasion of Normandy of 6 June 1944.

In the Pacific Theater, 4 Squadron of the Royal Australian Air Force began forward air control at the Battle of Buna-Gona, New Guinea in November 1942. The RAAF continued forward air control in the Pacific for the rest of the war. By November 1943, the U.S. Marines were using forward air control during the Battle of Bougainville.

The United States would end World War II still without an air control doctrine. When the U.S. Air Force split from the U.S. Army in 1947, neither took on the responsibility for forward air control; the U.S. military thus had no functional forward air control when the Korean War broke out.

== Post World War II ==
=== British Commonwealth operations ===
The United Kingdom and Commonwealth continued to build on their experience in the Second World War in various campaigns around the world in the second half of the twentieth century, including the Malayan Emergency, the Suez Crisis, the Indonesian Confrontation and operations in Aden and Oman. With the re-formation of the Army Air Corps in 1957 this new corps's functions included airborne forward air control.

== Korean War ==
Although the United States, as part of the United Nations Command (UNC) in the Korean War, entered the war on 26 June 1950 with no forward air controllers, it rapidly improvised close air support procedures for UNC forces. By 20 July, jury-rigged systems were not only controlling air strikes against the communist foe, but also occasionally directing aerial interceptions of opposing aircraft. Both the U.S. high command and North Korean General Nam Il agreed that only tactical air power saved United Nation forces from defeat during the mobile warfare stage of the war.

When the front lines bogged down into static trench warfare in Summer 1951, forward air control diminished in importance. To cope with the communist switch to night operations, both radar and Shoran bombing techniques were developed. However, close air support continued, and sometimes used to direct interdiction missions against the communist lines of communications. By this time, Allied air forces were contributing a considerable portion of the tactical air strikes.

By the cessation of hostilities, airborne forward air controllers alone were credited with flying 40,354 forward air control sorties, and directing air strikes that killed an estimated 184,808 communist troops. At times, tactical air was credited with inflicting about half of all communist casualties.

Despite having agreed on a common forward air control doctrine as embodied in Field Manual 31 - 35 Air-Ground Operations, a turf war over doctrine raged between the U.S. Air Force and the U.S. Army for the entire war. Additionally, the U.S. Marine Corps maintained its own FAC operation during the war. Also, U.S. Navy carrier aviation would not completely coordinate its operations with the Air Force/Army system until the final month of the war. With no common doctrine agreed upon during the war, forward air control systems were shut down postwar in 1956.

== Vietnam War ==
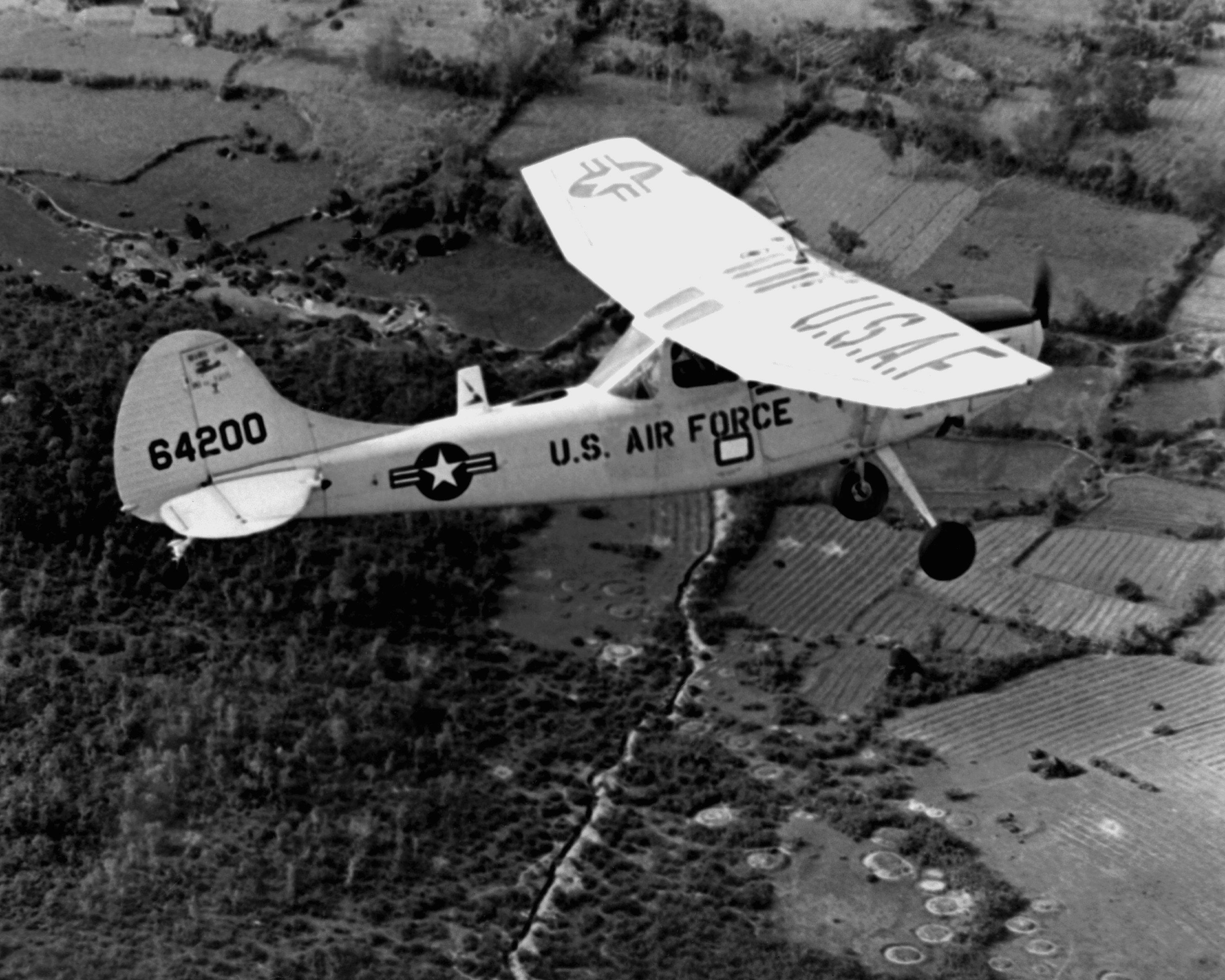
L-19/O-1 Bird Dog, used by Forward Air Controllers during the Vietnam War.

Forward air controllers played a major part in the largest bombing campaign in history during the Vietnam War. While World War II had featured indiscriminate mass air raids on major cities worldwide, bombing during the Vietnam War was aimed at smaller targets in a country the size of New Mexico. Unless bombs were dropped in a free fire zone, or on a pre-briefed target, the bombing in Vietnam was directed by FACs. Also unlike World War II, serious efforts were made to avoid hitting the civilian populace, which also called for FAC intervention.

=== Reinvention of forward air control ===
In 1961, when forward air control was revived, it promptly ran into the recurring problems of unreliable radios, a shortage of supplies, lack of suitable aircraft, differing concepts of close air support, and unfavorable terrain.

The first manning requirement for FACs, levied in 1962, amounted to 32 slots in Vietnam. Even as the slots slowly filled, the requirement proved inadequate. The 19th Tactical Air Support Squadron was then assigned in-country in mid-1963 to augment the FAC force. By January 1965, there were still only 144 USAF FACs in Southeast Asia. While the U.S. Air Force would continue to add more FACs, projecting a need for 831 FACs, and stationing four more Tactical Air Support Squadrons in Southeast Asia by April 1965, the manning levels of assigned FACs would run about 70% of need until December 1969. Other branches of the U.S. military also had FACs; the U.S. Army had at least two aviation companies of FACs, the U.S. Marine Corps had an organic FAC squadron within its forces, and the U.S. Navy established its own FAC squadron in the Mekong Delta. U.S. involvement had begun with a South Vietnamese FAC training program; later in the war, Laotians and Hmong were also trained as FACs.

=== Technological developments ===
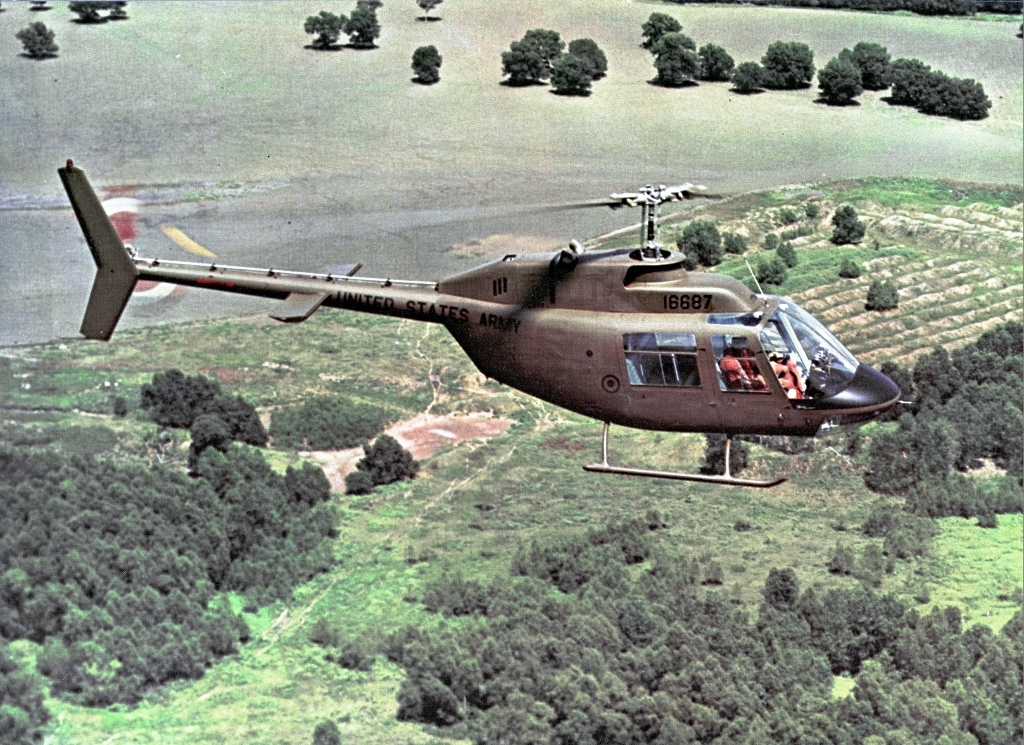
A U.S. Army Bell OH-58A-BF Kiowa (s/n 68-16687) in flight, source: Vietnam Studies - Airmobility 1961-1971

There was a great deal of technical innovation in forward air control operations during the course of the Vietnam War. The United States came up with a number of ways to make its forward air control system more effective. As early as 1962, Douglas C-47 flareship FACs began the forward air control mission in South Vietnam, mostly on night missions. In September 1965, another C-47 went into action as the first Airborne Command and Control Center. As additional ABCCC aircraft were added, they would constantly govern the air war in Southeast Asia.

By early 1966, a rising level of communist anti-aircraft fire against propeller-driven FAC aircraft necessitated the use of jet aircraft for FACs in high-risk areas in North Vietnam. The Fast FAC mission would supplement the FAC mission in Southeast Asia until war's end.

In July 1966, night FAC operations began against the Ho Chi Minh Trail; A-26 Invaders began a dual FAC/strike mission under call sign "Nimrod". The U.S. Air Force began Operation Shed Light as a test of night time battlefield illumination. In response to increasing pressure from air strikes, the communists turned entirely to night operations in Vietnam by 1968. C-123 Provider cargo aircraft were used as flareships to light up the Trail and direct air strikes, under the call sign "Candlestick", until late 1969. Withdrawn in the face of mounting opposition, the flareships would still serve elsewhere in theater until 30 June 1971. In a similar role, Lockheed AC-130 gunships, call sign "Blindbat", not only lit the Trail and directed air strikes, but used its own copious firepower on enemy trucks. The gunships carried both electronic sensors tied into Operation Igloo White and night observation devices for spotting enemy trucks, as well as a computerized fire control system.

On 1 November 1968, President Lyndon Johnson declared a halt to the bombing of North Vietnam. With that act, the focus of the contending forces became the Ho Chi Minh Trail. As the U.S. more than quadrupled the number of airstrikes aimed at interdiction, North Vietnamese anti-aircraft guns and gunners transferred south to the Trail to match this new onslaught. Both sides realized that the supply of military necessities being moved south to insurgents would be crucial to a communist victory. At about this time, the Raven FACs began supporting Vang Pao's Central Intelligence Agency-supported guerrilla army on the Plain of Jars in northern Laos with air strikes serving as aerial artillery blasting the way clear for offensive sweeps by the partisans.

In early 1970, in an attempt to improve bombing accuracy, the USAF began using laser guided ordnance.

=== Results ===
By May 1971, U.S. Air Force intelligence concluded that air strikes had wiped out all the North Vietnamese trucks on the Ho Chi Minh Trail. This was a demonstrably untrue conclusion, as trucks still traversed the Trail until the communist takeover in 1975. After war's end, the U.S. Air Force ended the forward air control mission, just as they had following World War II and Korea.

== Indo-Pakistani War ==
Major Atma Singh, of the Indian Army, flying a HAL Krishak, played a crucial part in a close air support defense against steep odds. The Pakistani loss of armor in December 1971 was one of the most severe since the great armored clashes of World War II. Major Singh won the Maha Vir Chakra for his performance under heavy ground fire.

== Portuguese Overseas War ==
During the Portuguese Overseas War, the Portuguese Air Force used mainly Dornier Do 27 and OGMA/Auster D.5 light aircraft in the forward air control role, in the several theatres of operation: Angola, Portuguese Guinea and Mozambique.

== Rhodesia ==
During the Rhodesian Bush War the Rhodesian Air Force mounted Airborne FACs in Aermacchi AL60 B Trojans and Lynx aircraft.

== South Africa ==
South Africa deployed both Airborne FACs (in AM.3CM Bosboks) and ground-based FACs during the Border War including the Battle of Cassinga. During the Force Intervention Brigade operations in the Democratic Republic of the Congo, an FAC called 27 missions.

== Present day doctrines ==
=== NATO ===
For NATO forces the qualifications and experience required to be a FAC are set out in a NATO Standard (STANAG). FACs may form part of a Fire Support Team or Tactical Air Control Party, they may be ground based, airborne FACs in fixed-wing aircraft (FAC-A) or in helicopters (ABFAC). Since 2003 the United States Armed Forces have used the term joint terminal attack controller (JTAC) for some of their ground based FACs.

NATO is making efforts to increase the safety and reduce the risk of fratricide in air to ground operations. Co-operation between different NATO agencies such as the NATO Standardization Agency and the JAPCC resulted in the development of common standards for Forward Air Controllers and these are now set out in STANAG 3797 (Minimum Qualifications for Forward Air Controllers). NATO FACs are trained to request, plan, brief and execute CAS operations both for Low Level and Medium/High Level operations and their training NATO FACs includes electronic warfare, suppression of enemy air defences, enemy air defence, air command and control, attack methods and tactics, weaponeering and Joint Air Attack Team Tactics.

=== United Kingdom armed forces ===
FACs in the United Kingdom are trained at the Joint Forward Air Controller Training and Standards Unit (JFACTSU) where controllers are drawn from all three services: The Royal Navy (Royal Marines and Royal Marines Reserve), the Army, and the RAF (RAF Regiment). UK FACs operate as TACPs or form part of Royal Artillery Fire Support Teams which direct artillery as well as close air support. The Army Air Corps provides Airborne Forward Air Controllers.

=== United States Marine Corps ===
When deployed on operations each USMC infantry company is allocated a FAC or JTAC. Such assignment (designated as a "B-Billet") is given to Marine aviators often as they are most knowledgeable about close air support and air superiority doctrines.

=== Afghanistan National Army ===
The Afghan National Army (ANA) relied on coalition partners to raise and sustain its FAC and Joint Fires Officer (JFO) capability. The ANA capability, known as the Afghan Tactical Air Coordinator maintained a skill equivalency to that of a JFO. The Australian Army operatives developed this capability within the ANA in late 2015 to 2016 to include NVG, ISR, Afghan Air Force/Army/Police and other units, which culminated in the enduring Joint exercise Tolo Aftab which was first held in January 2016 (https://www.armynewspaper.defence.gov.au/army-news/may-5th-2016/flipbook/6/). This was enhanced and developed by ADF personnel from RAAF and ARA until the fall of the elected Government.

== See also ==
- Air naval gunfire liaison company
- Artillery observer
- Fire Support Team
- Forward Air Control Development Unit RAAF
- Joint terminal attack controller
- Tactical Air Control Party
- United States Air Force Combat Control Team
