= M24 mine =

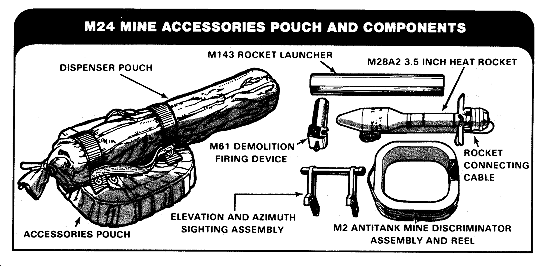
- Type: High-explosive anti-tank (HEAT) landmine
- Place of origin: United States

Service history
- In service: Discontinued
- Wars: Angolan Civil War

Production history
- Designed: December 1961
- Manufacturer: Picatinny Arsenal
- Produced: September 1968

Specifications
- Mass: 8.20 kg
- Length: 59.70 cm
- Diameter: 8.90 cm
- Filling: Composition B
- Filling weight: 853 g

The M24 mine is a United States off-route land mine based on the M28A2 high-explosive anti-tank (HEAT) rocket normally fired by an M20 Super Bazooka 3.5 inch rocket launcher. The rocket was launched from an M143 plastic launch tube.

== Operation ==
A trigger cable is laid across a road. When enough pressure occurs in the cable, two conductors inside the cable are forced together closing a circuit. The trigger cable consists of two segments, requiring simultaneous pressure on both segments to trigger the mine. For wheeled vehicles, the cable is laid directly across a road so that wheels on both sides of the vehicle will touch the cable at the same time. For tracked vehicles, the cable is laid at an angle of fifteen degrees to prevent the cable slipping between the treads on the tracks and thus sensing no pressure.

The rocket has a maximum effective range of about 30 metres (98 ft), beyond which it became too inaccurate to reliably strike a target.

The mine is long out of production and no longer in US service. It may have been used in Angola.

== See also ==
- List of U.S. Army rocket launchers
- PARM 1 mine – (Germany)
- TM-83 mine – (Soviet Union, Russia)
- MPB mine – (Poland)
