= PARM 1 mine =

German off-route anti-tank mine

PARM 1
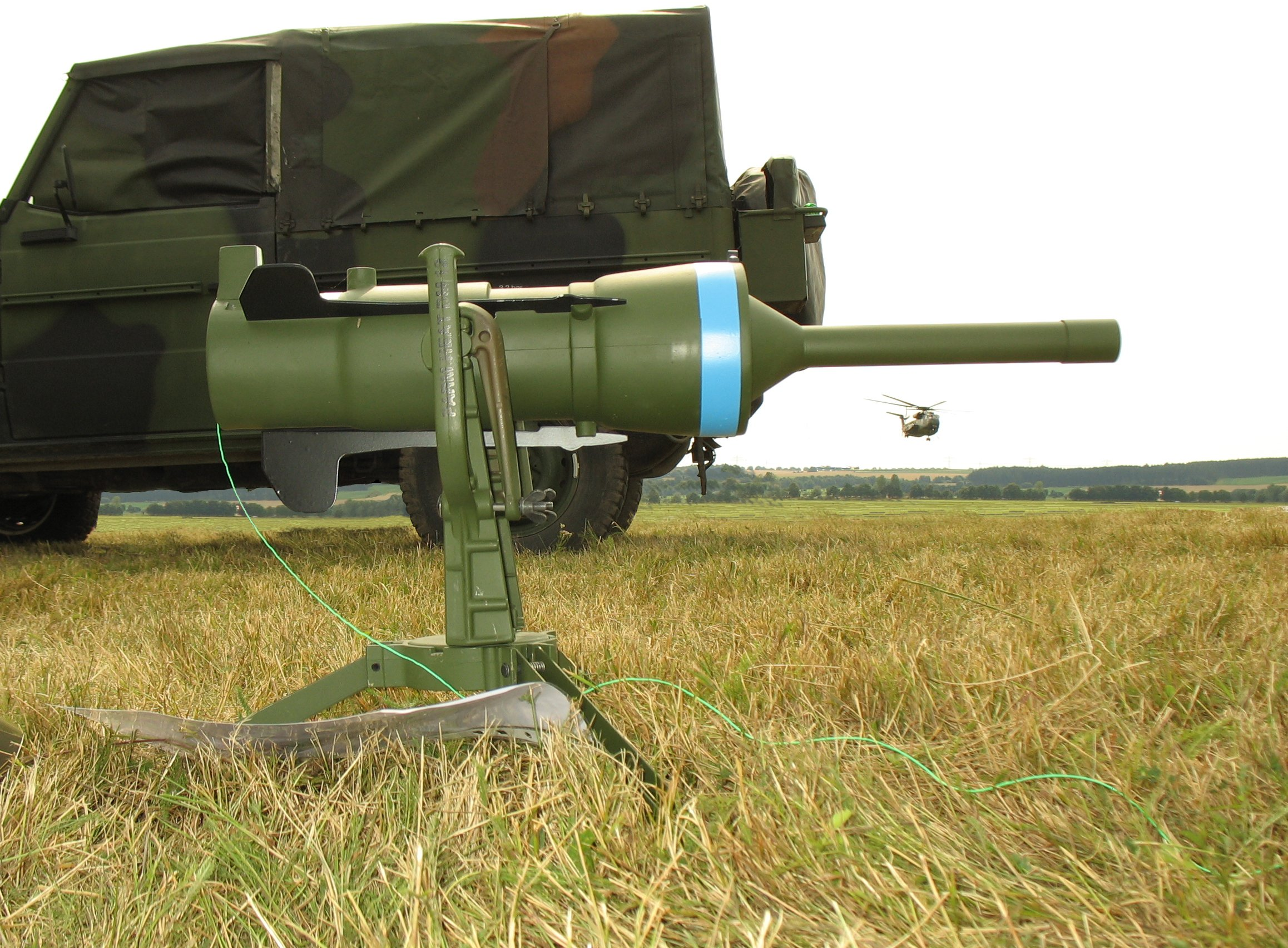
- An inert, training version of the PARM1 DM-12
- Type: Off-route anti-tank mine
- Place of origin: West Germany

Service history
- In service: 1988–present
- Used by: Germany, Ukraine
- Wars: Russian invasion of Ukraine

Production history
- Variants: PARM 2

Specifications
- Detonation mechanism: Fibre-optic crush sensor, or by command

The PARM 1 (DM12) and its improved version (DM22) is a German off-route mine that fires a fin stabilized rocket. PARM stands for PanzerAbwehrRichtMine, anti-tank directional mine.

== Development ==
The mine was developed in the early 1980s to meet the US MIL-STD-331A and US MIL-STD-810C requirements. Trials of the mine were conducted between March 1983 and March 1988. In June 1988 it was accepted into service with the Bundeswehr, with the Army receiving the first batch of 25,000 between 1991 and 1994. The PARM 2 was a development of PARM 1 incorporating an infrared sensor and an improved rocket.

The German Ministry of Defense signed a contract with TDW in October 2023 to deliver mines to replace those sent to Ukraine, restarting DM22 production for the first time since 1998. 2,600 mines are initially ordered with an option for 10,000 more; the first production qualification batch is planned for 2025, with serial production starting in 2026, and first deliveries planned for 2027.

== Variants ==
=== PARM 1 ===
The PARM 1 is mounted on a small tripod, allowing it to be traversed through 360 degrees, elevated to 90 degrees and depressed to −45 degrees. The mine is manually emplaced and incorporates an arming delay of five minutes. It is detonated by a fibre optic trigger cable, which triggers the mine when it is crushed.

The mine has an effective range of between 2 and 40 metres (7 and 131 ft). The rocket has a velocity of approximately 120 metres per second (390 ft/s; 270 mph), and has a claimed armour penetration of 600 millimetres (24 in).

The modified DM22 automatically deactivates after 40 days.

1600 DM22 mines were delivered to Ukrainian armed services in early May 2022.

=== PARM 2 ===
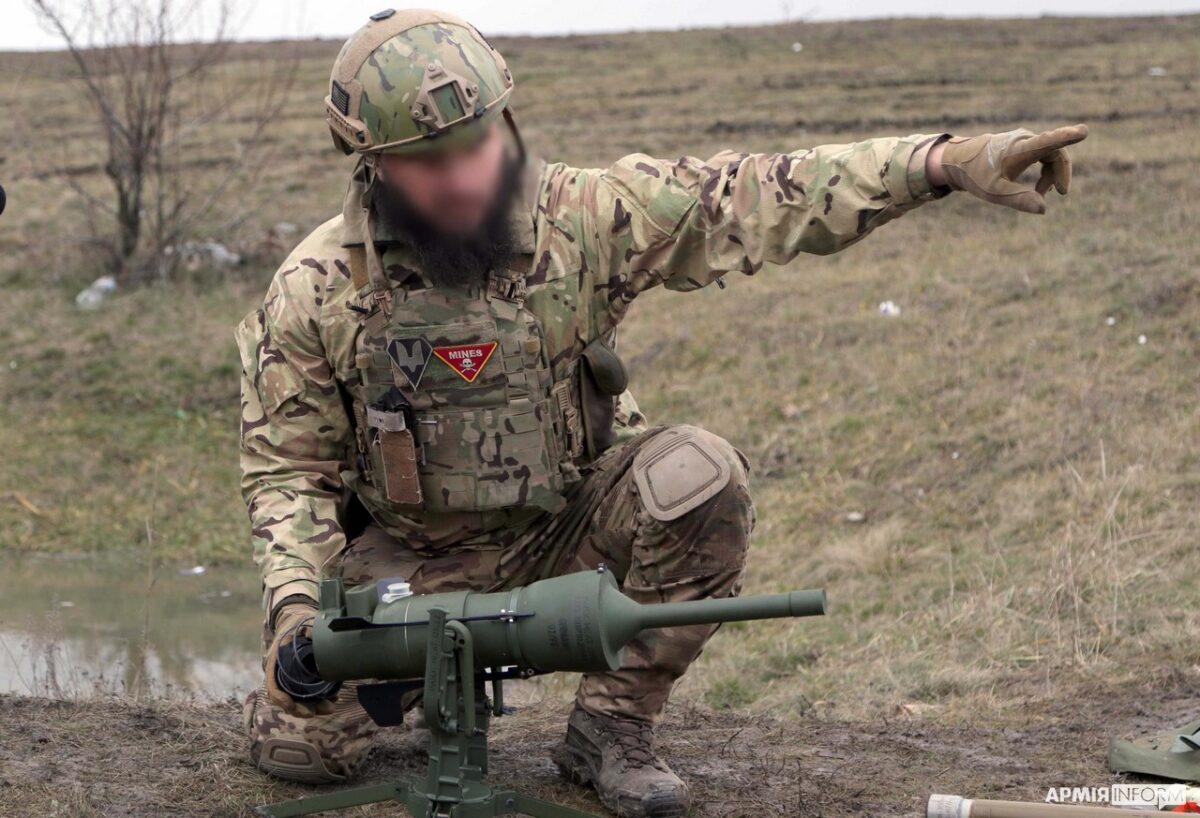
PARM (DM-22)

The PARM 2 incorporates an infrared sensor, the SAPIR, which acts to accurately fire the rocket to ranges up to 100 metres (330 ft). The warhead of the PARM 2 has been upgraded, with armour penetration of 750 millimetres (30 in) and a capability against reactive armour. It can be programmed to be active for between several hours and 30 days.

=== PARM NextGen ===
The PARM NextGen was introduced in 2024, and compared to the PARM 2 (DM 22), it has a 50% increased range.

=== DM58 ===
The DM58 is a training variant of the PARM mine system.

=== Specifications ===
Model	PARM 1	PARM 2
Length	640 mm	?
Height	391 mm	300 to 700 mm
Warhead diameter	132 mm	110 mm
Weight	10 kg	20 kg
Warhead	1.4 kg	1.9 kg
Range	2 to 40 m	4 to 100 m

== Operators ==
=== Current operators ===
Germany
Germany operates DM12 and DM22 mines.
Ukraine (3,420)
Germany supplied some mines that were in storage in the early stages of the full scale invasion of Ukraine.
As of April 2025, 3,420 mines were supplied to Ukraine.

=== Future operators ===
Germany
2,600 DM 22 ordered in October 2023 as part of a framework agreement with an option for 10,000 additional mines, to be ordered by tranches of 1,000 mines.
In April 2025, an agreement was signed with Norway and Latvia for a common procurement of additional DM22 mines.
Latvia
In April 2025, an agreement was signed with Norway and Germany for a common procurement of additional DM22 mines.
Norway
In April 2025, an agreement was signed with Germany and Latvia for a common procurement of additional DM22 mines.

== See also ==
- M24 mine
- TM-83 mine
- MPB mine
- FFV 016 mine
- List of military aid to Ukraine during the Russo-Ukrainian War
