= Bofors/Nexter Bonus =

Swedish-French 155 mm artillery round

155 mm BONUS
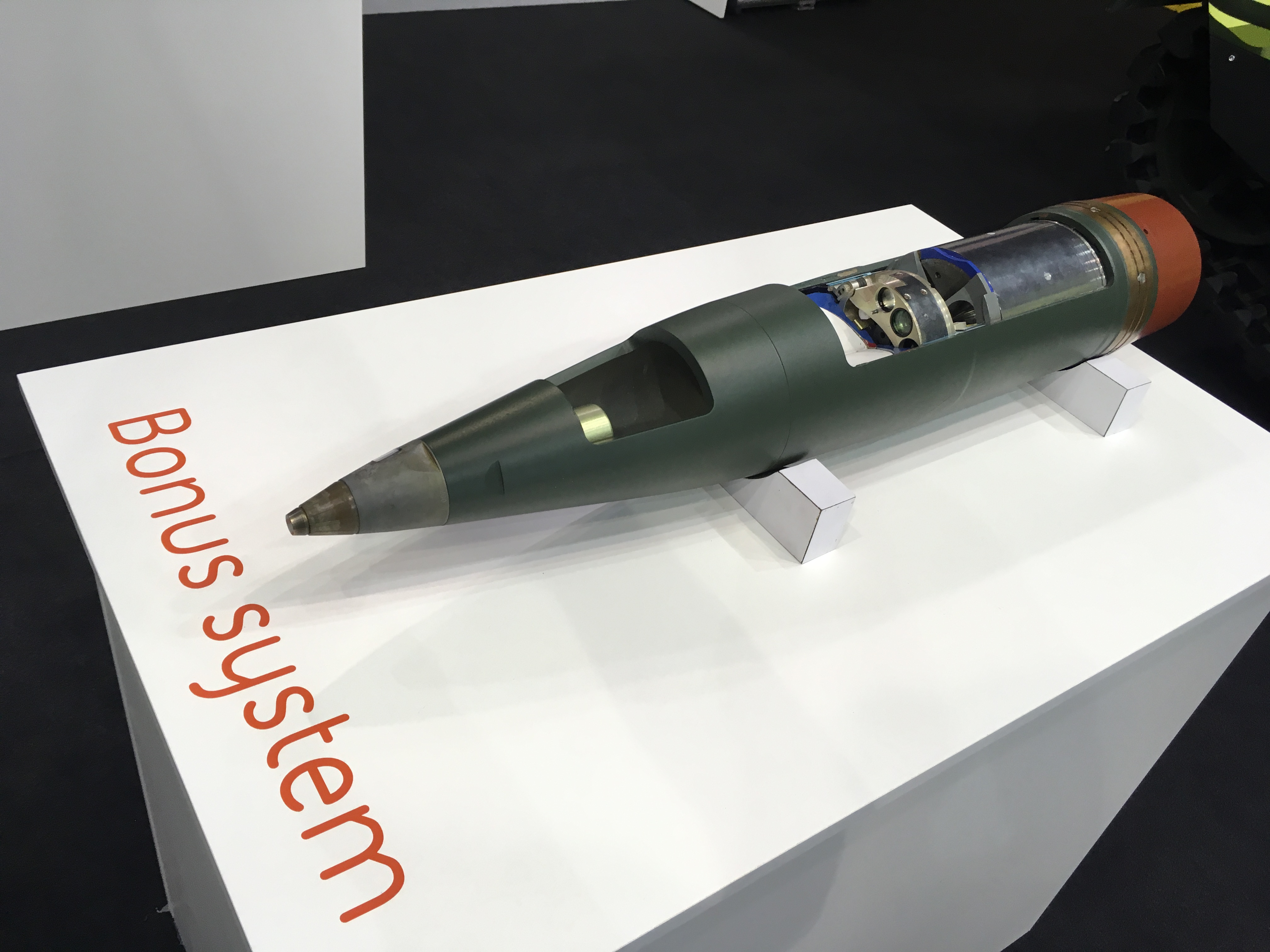
- BONUS 155 mm construction
- Type: Smart artillery round Sensor-fuzed submunition
- Place of origin: Sweden / France

Service history
- In service: 2000–present
- Used by: See operators

Production history
- Designer: Bofors AB; Nexter Systems
- Designed: 1985–1997
- Manufacturer: BAE Systems Platforms & Services; Nexter Systems
- Produced: 1998–present

Specifications
- Mass: 44.6 kg (98 lb) unfused
- Length: 898 mm (35.4 in) unfused
- Diameter: 155 mm (6.1 in)
- Muzzle velocity: 830 m/s (2,723 ft/s) from 39-caliber barrels
- Maximum firing range: 27 km (17 mi) from 39-caliber barrels; 35 km (22 mi) from 52-caliber barrels
- Filling: 2 x autonomous anti-armour and anti-artillery submunitions
- References: Janes

The BONUS (Bofors Nutating Shell) or ACED (Anti-Char à Effet Dirigé) is a 155 mm guided artillery cluster round co-developed and manufactured by Bofors of Sweden and Nexter of France. It was designed to fulfill a long range, indirect fire, top attack requirement against armoured fighting vehicles.

The BONUS base bleed carrier shell contains two submunitions, which descend over the battlefield on winglets and attack targets with explosively formed penetrator warheads.

== Background ==
The programme was launched in early 1985 as a project study for the Swedish Defence Materiel Administration, with development completion initially expected by 1989 and production by 1990. In 1990, however, development completion was said to have slipped to 1992, the programme suffering delays. In June 1992, a military cooperation protocol was signed between Sweden and France. This partnership took concrete form on March 7, 1993 in Stockholm, with the conclusion of a special agreement on the development and production of an "intelligent" munition: the BONUS OBG artillery shell. The French Defense Minister, Pierre Joxe, stated the agreement would "undoubtedly make it possible to combine Swedish and French technologies, which are very advanced in this field". His Swedish counterpart, Anders Björck, meanwhile, emphasized the "historic" nature of this cooperation with France, "which is undoubtedly the most technologically advanced of Sweden's possible partners".

The BONUS was to be a smart anti-tank weapon with a range of over 25 km (16 mi), which releases two submunitions at an altitude of 1,000 m (3,300 ft) above the theater of operations, with terminal and precise target guidance. First delivery was scheduled for 1995 at the time of the cooperation agreement but ultimately, the BONUS only entered production 5 years later in 1998 and then, French and Swedish service in 2000.

== Design ==
Schematic of the 155 BONUS round

155 BONUS is a 155 mm NATO artillery round that consists of a 47-kilogram (104 lb) heavy artillery projectile containing two autonomous, sensor-fused, fire-and-forget submunitions.

After the submunition is released it opens two winglets. While descending, the submunition rotates, scanning the area below with multi-frequency infrared sensors and LiDAR that compares the detected vehicles with a programmable target database. The submunitions each contain a high-penetration EFP warhead for use against even heavy armoured fighting vehicles like main battle tanks.

When fired from a 52-caliber barrel, a BONUS shell can travel up to 35 km (22 mi).

== Operation ==

1: After setting range and target profile(s), the BONUS round is fired from a standard NATO 155mm artillery tube.

2: The round flies on a ballistic arc, with a range of up to 35 kilometres (21.7 mi).

3: Mid-flight, a time fuze ignites an ejection charge in the nose that pushes the submunitions out of the base of the projectile.

4: The submunitions deploy winglets, and independently corkscrew down over the subject area at 900 rpm, scanning for targets.

5: Once a submunition detects a target vehicle beneath it, it detonates its explosive payload, creating an explosively formed projectile which strikes the target vehicle's weak top armour. The high-velocity impactor penetrates the hull and kills or wounds the crew.

== Operational history ==
The BONUS shell was first used in operations on December 3, 2018 by the French Wagram artillery detachment in Iraq, as part of French operations against the Islamic State. Four shells destroyed a convoy of eight Islamic State vehicles.

In the context of the 2022 Russian invasion of Ukraine, BONUS rounds were supplied by France (and potentially Sweden and Norway) to the latter. Although various analysts and web users speculated a BONUS shell had struck a Russian Pantsir-S1 system on July 5, 2022, it turned out to be a SMArt 155 strike. However, in January 2023, French-produced BONUS shells were visually confirmed to be in Ukrainian service. In July 2024 a BONUS shell was used to destroy a Russian T-90M main battle tank near the village of Robotyne. Sometime in 2024-2025, five BONUS shells were used against a platoon of three Russian tanks with all three tanks knocked out in two minutes.

== Competing systems ==
The BONUS is similar to the German SMArt 155 system; the SMArt 155 descends on a parachute rather than a system of winglets, and uses a millimeter radar as altimeter instead of LIDAR.

The United States developed the similar M898 SADARM system (which also descended on a ballute to attack the top surfaces of armoured vehicles), but this was discontinued in favor of the GPS guided M982 Excalibur round. US artillery units also largely deploys the M712 Copperhead laser-guided round for the anti-tank role.

== Qualified systems ==
List of Howitzers:

- BAE Archer
- K9 Thunder
  - 155 PSH K9 FIN (Finnish Army)
  - VIDAR (Norwegian Army)
- M109 A6 / A7 (US Army)
- M777 (US Army)
- Nexter Caesar (Mk1 and to be qualified with the Mk2)
  - Caesar Mk 1 on Sherpa 5 chassis (French Army and Ukrainian Army)
  - Caesar Mk 1 on Unimog U2450L chassis (Saudi Arabia)
  - Caesar Mk 2 on Armis chassis (French Army)
- 155 GH 52 APU

== Operators ==
Finland
The Finnish Army has operated the Bonus shell since 2016.
Orders:
- 2014: first order of the Bonus Mk II
- 2023: order of the Bonus Mk II, worth around €35 million
France
The French Army has operated the Bonus shell since 2000.
Norway
The Norwegian Army is operating the Bonus shell.
Saudi Arabia
The Saudi Arabian National Guard has operated the Bonus shell since 2012.
1,000 shells ordered in 2011.
Sweden
The Swedish Army has operated the Bonus shell since 2000.
Orders:
- November 2017, 254 ordered
- May 2025, order worth SEK600 million.
Ukraine
The Ukrainian Ground Forces has operated the Bonus shell since 2022.
United States
The US Army has operated the Bonus shell since 2020.
Orders:
- October 2018
- March 2020

== See also ==
- Krasnopol – (Russia, Soviet Union)
- Bofors STRIX – (Sweden)
- XM395 Precision Guided Mortar Munition – (United States)
