= M198 howitzer =

American 155 mm towed howitzer

M198
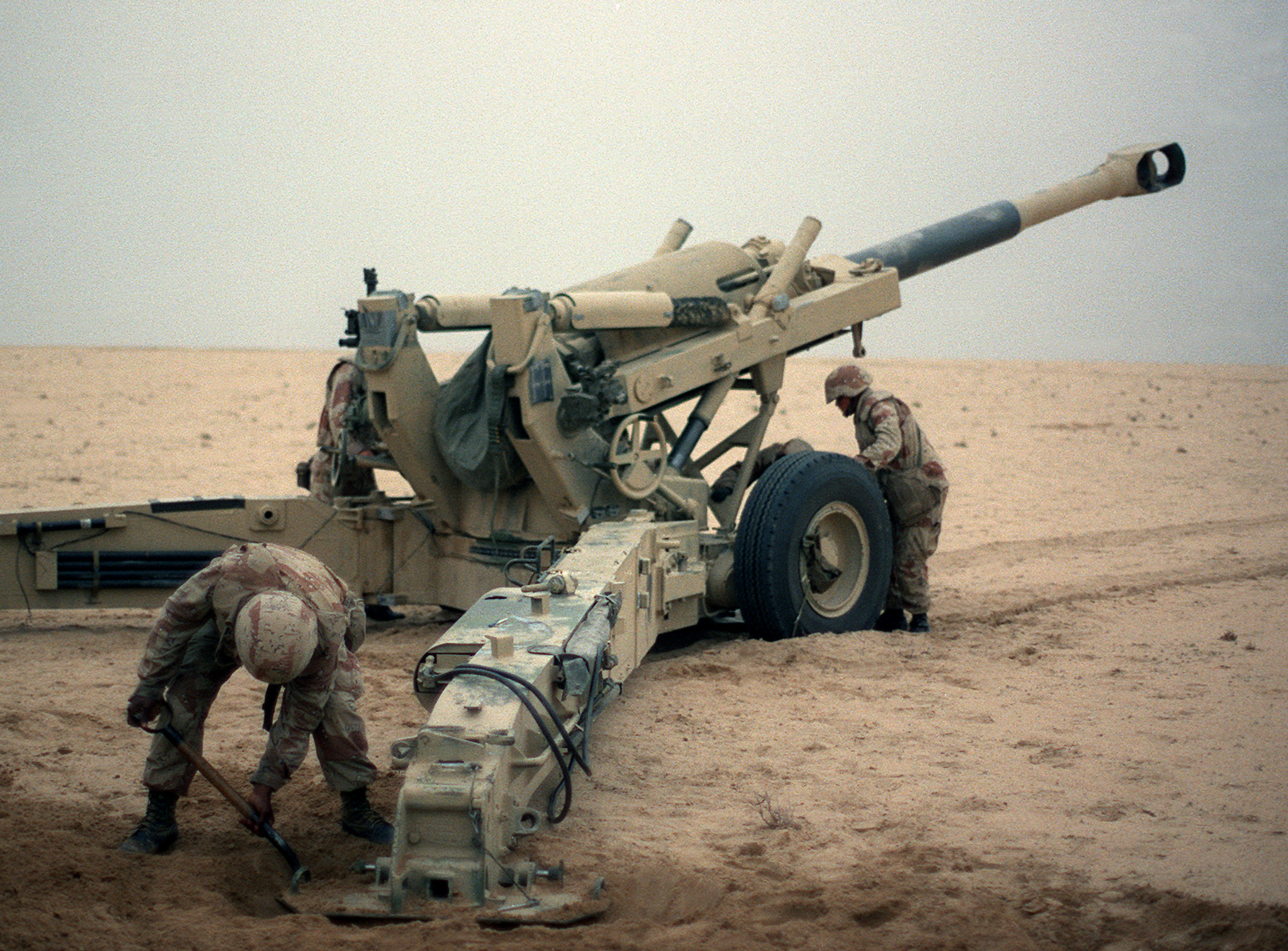
- Type: Towed howitzer
- Place of origin: United States

Service history
- In service: 1979–present
- Used by: See Operators
- Wars: Lebanese Civil War; Gulf War; Somali Civil War; War in Afghanistan (2001–2021); Iraq War; War in Iraq (2013-2017); Syrian Civil War; 2025 Cambodia‒Thailand conflict 2026 Afghanistan-Pakistan war

Production history
- Designed: 1968–1977
- Manufacturer: Rock Island Arsenal (US)
- Unit cost: US$ 527,337
- Produced: 1978–1992
- No. built: 1,600+

Specifications
- Mass: 7,154 kg (15,772 lb)
- Length: Combat: 11 m (36 ft 2 in); Travel: 12.3 m (40 ft 6 in)
- Barrel length: 6.09 m (19.98 ft) L/39
- Width: Travel: 2.8 m (9 ft 2 in)
- Height: Travel: 2.9 m (9 ft 6 in)
- Crew: 9 enlisted men
- Shell: Separate loading charge and projectile
- Caliber: 155 mm (6.1 inch)
- Breech: Interrupted screw
- Recoil: Hydro-pneumatic
- Carriage: Split trail
- Elevation: −5° to +72°
- Traverse: 45°
- Rate of fire: Maximum: 4 rpm Sustained: 2 rpm
- Muzzle velocity: 684 m/s (2,240 ft/s)
- Maximum firing range: Conventional: 22.4km (14 mi), RAP: 30km (18.6 mi), RAP and L/52 barrel: 40km (25 mi)

The M198 is a medium-sized, towed 155 mm artillery piece, developed for service with the United States Army and Marine Corps. It was commissioned to be a replacement for the World War II-era M114 155 mm howitzer. It was designed and prototyped at the Rock Island Arsenal in 1969 with firing tests beginning in 1970 and went into full production there in 1978. It entered service in 1979 and since then 1,600 units have been produced.

The M198 was replaced in US and Australian service by the M777 howitzer.

== Description ==
The M198 155 mm howitzer weighs less than 16,000 pounds (7,300 kg), allowing it to be dropped by parachute or transported by a CH-53E Super Stallion or CH-47 Chinook. The M198 is towed by a 5-short-ton (4.5 t; 4.5-long-ton) truck that is used to carry the nine person crew with supplies and ammunition; it is transported tail first. The gun tube can be rotated over the howitzer's trail legs to reduce its length, though this requires removal of the muzzle brake, or left in the firing position for faster deployment. When firing, the weapon is lowered onto its baseplate rather than anchored to the ground, allowing for rapid emplacement. The breech is operated manually via a screw type mechanism that rests low in an ergonomic position.

The M198 fires separate-loading (non-fixed or semi-fixed) ammunition and can be loaded with a variety of propellants and projectiles. The effective range is 18.1 km (11.2 mi) when firing standard projectiles, which increases to 30 km (19 mi) when firing rocket-assisted projectiles and guided ammunition. With the 52-caliber modification, the range can surpass 40 km (25 mi). The weapon system requires a crew of nine, and is capable of firing at a maximum rate of four rounds per minute, two sustained.

The M198 was deployed in separate corps- and army-level field artillery units, as well as in artillery battalions of light and airborne divisions. It provided field artillery fire support for all Marine Air-Ground Task Force organizations until the adoption of the M777 howitzer.

== Ammunition types ==
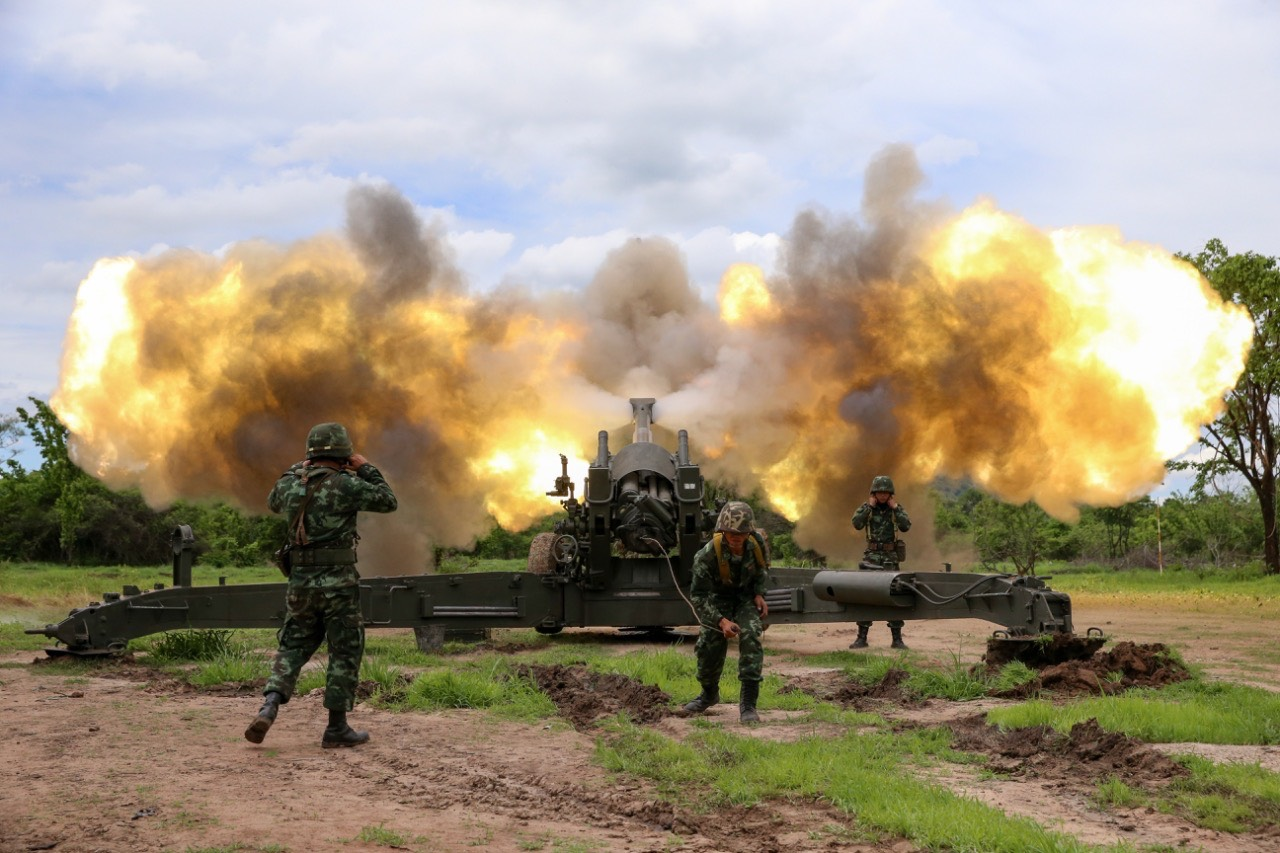
Royal Thai Army firing M198 howitzer

High explosive (HE)
(M-107 NC/DC): Explosive Composition B material packed into a thick, internally scored shell which causes a large blast and sends razor-sharp fragments at extreme velocities (5,000–6,000 m/s (16,000–20,000 ft/s)). The kill zone has an approximate radius of 50 m (160 ft), and the casualty radius is 100 m (330 ft). The Marine Corps and US Army also uses the M795 High Explosive round.

Rocket-assisted projectile (RAP)
A high-explosive rocket-assisted (HERA) M549 round with a greater range than the normal HE. The maximum range is 30.1 km (18.7 mi).

White phosphorus
A base-ejecting projectile which can come in two versions: felt-wedge and standard. White phosphorus smoke is used to start fires, burn a target, or to create smoke which is useful in concealing the movements of friendly units.

Illumination
Illumination projectiles are base-ejecting rounds which deploy a bright parachute flare ideally 600 m (2,000 ft) above the ground and illuminate an area of approximately 1 grid square (1 km^{2} (0.39 sq mi)). Illumination rounds are often used in conjunction with HE rounds to illuminate the target area so that HE rounds can be fired more effectively. Illumination rounds can also be used during the daytime to mark targets for aircraft. The M485 illumination round burns for 120 seconds.

Dual-Purpose Improved Conventional Munition (DPICM)
A base-ejecting projectile that drops 88 bomblets above a target. Each bomblet has a shaped-charge munition capable of penetrating 50 mm of solid steel as well as a fragmentation casing which is effective against infantry in the open. The DPICM round is effective against armored vehicles, even tanks (since the deck armor is usually the thinnest on the vehicle), and is also extremely useful against entrenched infantry in positions with overhead cover.

Area Denial Artillery Munition System (ADAMS)
An artillery round that releases anti-personnel mines. These mines eject tripwires to act as booby traps, and when triggered are launched upward before exploding. They are designed to self-destruct after a predetermined period.

Remote Anti Armor Mine System (RAAMS)
An artillery round that releases anti-armor mines, usually used along with ADAMS rounds to prevent the antitank mines from being removed. Designed to self-destruct after a predetermined period.

Copperhead
An artillery launched guided high-explosive munition used for very precise targeting of high-value targets such as tanks and bunkers. No longer produced or used by the US military, it required the target to be designated with a laser designator system.

Sense and Destroy ARMor (SADARM)
An experimental munition fired in the general direction of an enemy vehicle. The shell activates at a certain point in time ejecting a parachute and then guides itself to the nearest vehicle.

XM454 AFAP (artillery fired atomic projectile) (W48)
The XM454 AFAP (W48) nuclear artillery shell had a 155mm caliber and an explosive yield of only 72 tonnes of TNT (300 GJ). All units were retired from service in 1992.

== Replacement ==
BAE Systems won the contract to replace the M198 in the US Army and Marine Corps with its M777 155 mm/39 cal towed howitzer, which weighs less than 4,200 kg (9,300 lb). It was introduced in 2005.

== Operators ==
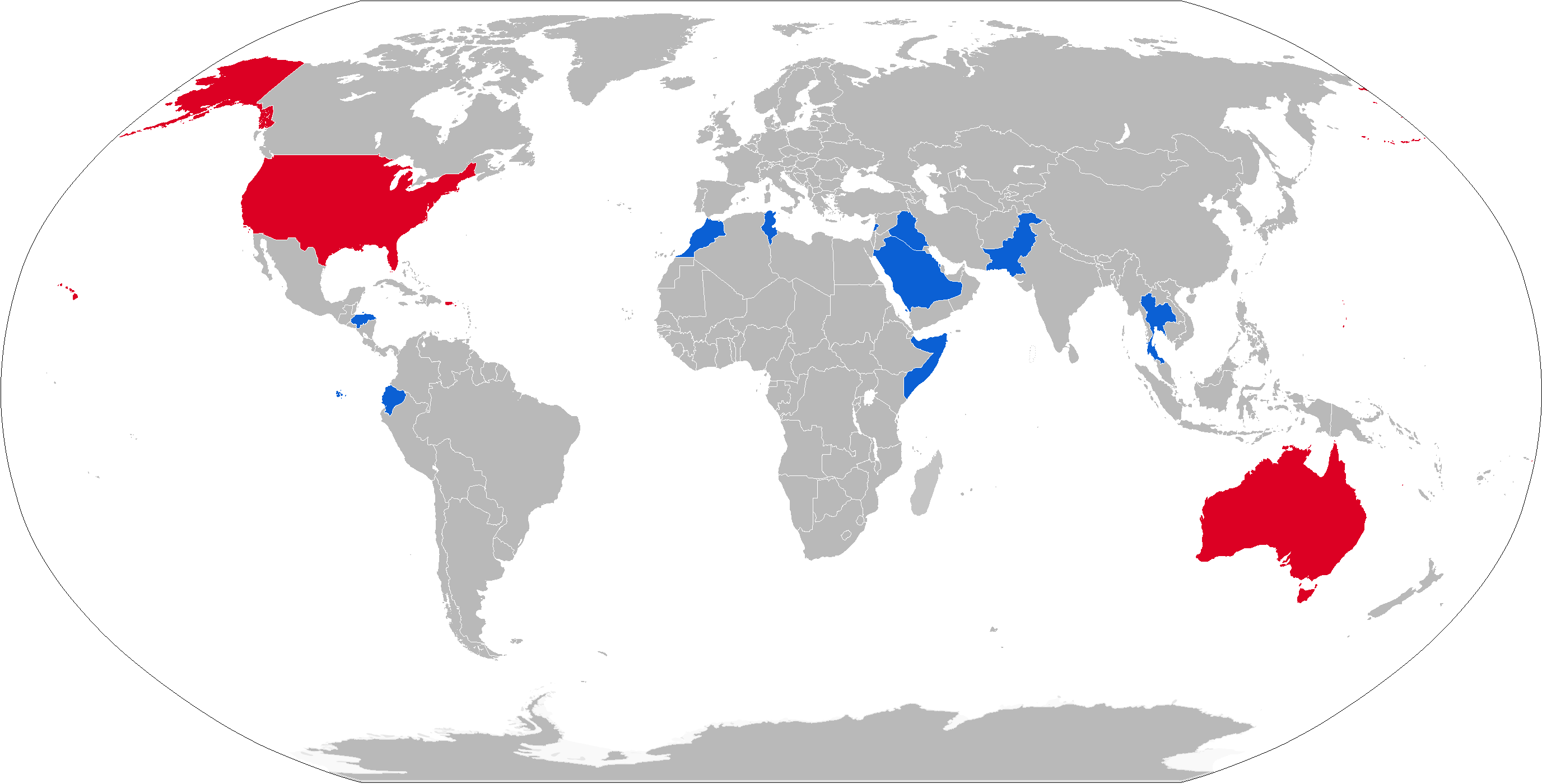
Map with M198 operators in blue and former operators in red

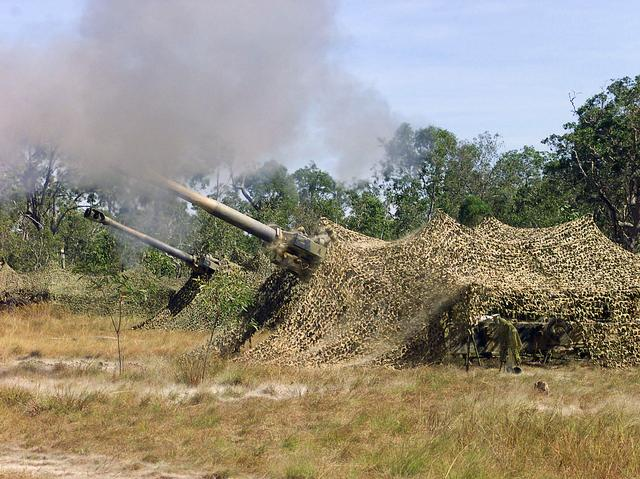
Australian M198s firing during an exercise

=== Current operators ===
- Bahrain: 28 in service with the Royal Bahraini Army
- Ecuador: 10
- El Salvador: 12
- Honduras: 4
- Iraq: 60
  - Kurdistan
- Lebanon: 218
- Morocco: 35 units.
- Pakistan: 148
- Saudi Arabia: 60 in service with the Saudi Arabian Army and 58 in service with the Saudi Arabian National Guard
- Tunisia: 55
- Thailand: 118 units in service with Royal Thai Army

=== Former operators ===
- Australia: 36
- ISIS: 52 captured. Some were taken back while other were destroyed by air strikes.
- Somalia: 18 used during the Siad Barre era
- United States: 358

== See also ==
- List of artillery
- List of crew served weapons of the US Armed Forces
- 2A36 Giatsint-B – Soviet 152 mm towed field gun
- 152 mm howitzer 2A65 Msta-B – Soviet towed artillery
- Soltam M-71 – Israeli 155 mm towed howitzer
- KH179 – South Korean 155 mm towed howitzer
- M795 – American 155 mm high explosive howitzer projectile
- M864 – American 155 mm base-bleed DPICM artillery projectile

== Bibliography ==
- Institute for Strategic Studies (1989). The military balance, 1989-1990. London: Brassey's. ISBN 978-0080375694.
- International Institute for Strategic Studies (February 2016). The Military Balance 2016. Vol. 116. Routledge. ISBN 978-1-85743-835-2.
- International Institute for Strategic Studies (12 February 2024). The Military Balance 2024 (Report) (1st ed.). Routledge. ISBN 9781040051153.
