= M303 =

M303 or M-303 may refer to:

- M303 Special Operations Forces demolition kit
- FN 303, a semi-automatic non-lethal launcher manufactured by Fabrique Nationale de Herstal
