= SMACM =

SMACM may refer to:

- Senior members of the ACM, the 3rd highest grade in the Association for Computing Machinery
- Surveilling Miniature Attack Cruise Missile, a long range, high endurance, expendable, unmanned aerial vehicle (UAV) under development by Lockheed Martin
