= MSM MK2 mine =

Anti-tank mine

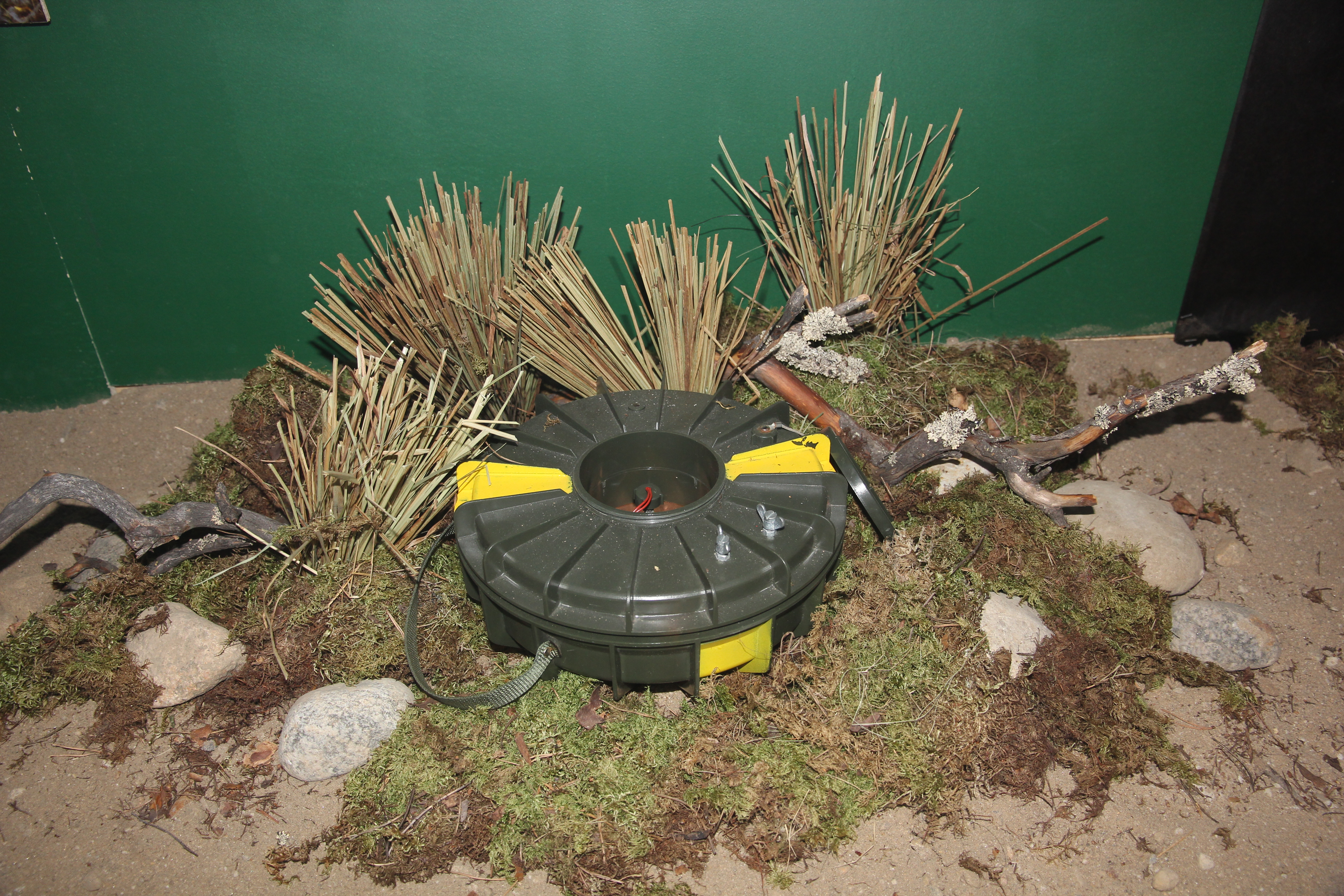
PM-87

The MSM MK2 (also known as the PM-87) is a Finnish belly attack anti-tank mine. The mine has a circular ribbed plastic case that is tapered towards the bottom. It uses an electronic fuze with a combination magnetic and seismic fuze; it also has an anti-handling device. The mine is armed by inserting an arming pin, which completes an electronic circuit. The mine indicates that it is armed by lighting a small LED light which switches off after 10 minutes. When a vehicle approaches, vibrations travelling through the ground trigger the seismic sensor, which activates the magnetic sensor. When a vehicle passes over the mine, the warhead is triggered. First a clearing charge fire, removing up to 100 millimeters of earth from the top of the mine, then a copper-lined Misznay Schardin effect warhead is triggered. This projects a slug of copper at high velocity into the bottom of the target.

The mine is in service with the Finnish Defence Forces.

== Specifications ==
- Diameter: 270 mm
- Height: 150 mm
- Weight: 7,5 kg
- Explosive content: 4 kg of Composition B
