= FFV 016 mine =

Land mine

Fordonsmina 14
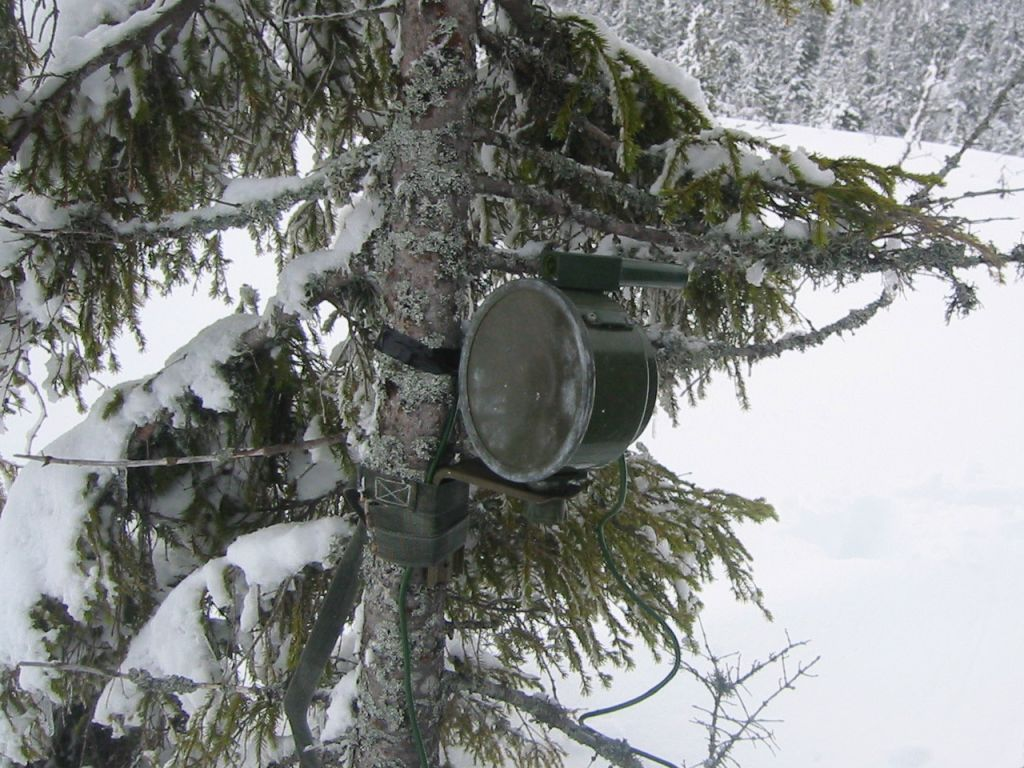
- A Fordonsmina 14 on a tree
- Type: Off-route mine
- Place of origin: Sweden

Production history
- Manufacturer: Saab Bofors Dynamics

The FFV 016 is a Swedish designed off-route mine designed for use against lightly armoured vehicles.

== Design ==
The mine uses the Misnay Schardin effect warhead to produce a self-forging fragment that has an initial velocity of approximately 2,000 metres per second and can penetrate 60 mm of armour at 30 metres range.

The mine's body is circular, with a dished front which is aimed using a simple built in sight along the expected route of the target.

The mine is normally fixed to a tree or pole, and is command detonated.

== Specifications ==
- Diameter: 150 mm
- Weight: 2.6 kg
- Maximum range: 100 m
- Effective range: 30 m

== Usage ==
The mine is currently in service with the Swedish army, where it is known as the Fordonsmina 14 or Frdm 14 for short and is produced by Saab Bofors Dynamics.

== Users ==
- Sweden
