= SMArt 155 =

German anti-vehicle "smart" artillery round

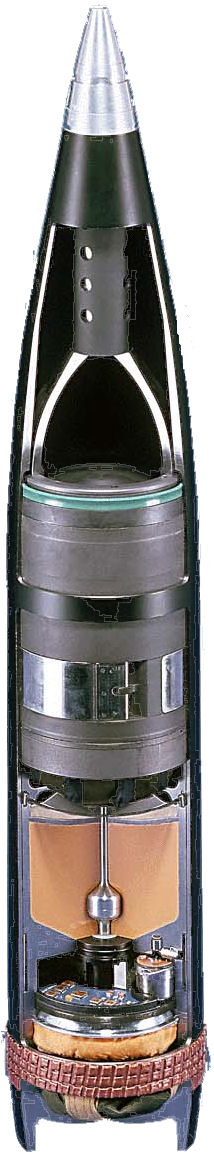
- A cutaway view of a SMArt 155 round, showing both submunitions. In this picture the lower submunition is itself shown in cutaway.
- Type: Smart submunition artillery projectile
- Place of origin: Germany

Service history
- In service: Since 2000
- Used by: See operators

Production history
- Designed: 1989–1995
- Manufacturer: Gesellschaft für Intelligente WirkSysteme mbH; (50% Rheinmetall; 50% Diehl BGT Defence)
- Produced: Since 1998

Specifications
- Mass: 47.3 kg (104 lb) fused
- Length: 898 mm (35.4 in) fused
- Diameter: 155 mm (6.1 in)
- Maximum firing range: 22.5 km (14 mi) from 39‐caliber barrels; 27.5 km (17.1 mi) from 52‐caliber barrels
- Filling: 2 x autonomous anti‐armour and anti‐artillery submunitions
- References: Janes

The SMArt 155 is a German 155 mm guided artillery round designed for a long-range, indirect fire top-attack role against armoured vehicles. The projectile was developed in 1989 by Diehl BGT Defence in Überlingen, Germany, with Rheinmetall and started full-rate production for the German Army in 1998. It consists of a 47-kilogram (104 lb) heavy artillery projectile containing two autonomous, sensor-fused, "fire-and-forget" submunitions. Due to the submunitions, it has been considered by some to be a cluster munition. As of 2008, representatives of the German defense ministry have referred to it as not being classified as submunition weapons, which were prohibited by the 2008 Convention on Cluster Munitions.

== Description ==
The name SMArt 155 is a contraction of its German name, Suchzünder Munition für die Artillerie 155 (meaning "sensor-fuse munition for 155mm artillery").

== History ==
The projectile was developed in 1989, and GIWS started full-rate production for the German Army in 1998.

== Design ==
Schematic of the SMArt 155 round

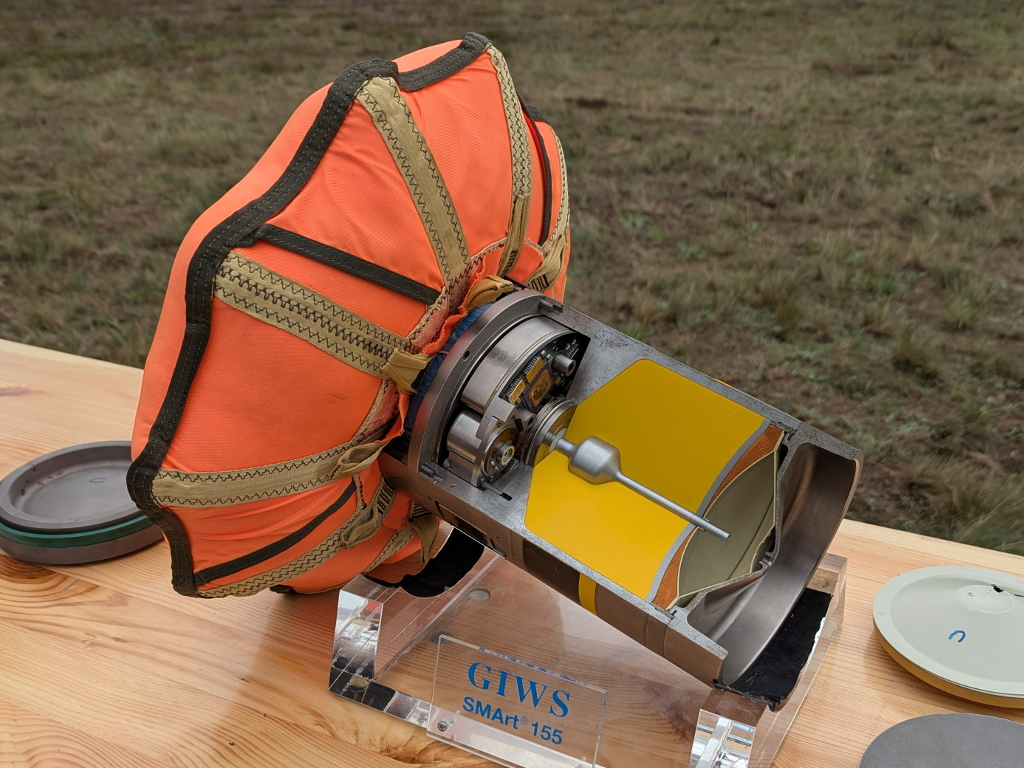
Cut away photo of SMArt 155 submunition.

SMArt 155 is a 155 mm NATO artillery round designed to be fired from the Panzerhaubitze 2000 and the M109 howitzers, including the Paladin variant. It consists of a 47-kilogram (104 lb) heavy artillery projectile containing two autonomous, sensor-fused, fire-and-forget submunitions. The submunitions each contain a high-penetration EFP warhead for use against heavy armoured fighting vehicles such as main battle tanks. The EFP warhead uses a heavy metal liner.

After the submunition is released, it opens a parachute. While slowly descending, the submunition rotates, scanning the area below with an infrared sensor and a millimeter wave radar.

The utilization of several types of sensors allows SMArt 155 to be used in all terrain types and weather conditions.

== Operation ==

1: A SMArt 155 round is fired from a standard NATO 155mm artillery tube.

2: The round flies on a ballistic arc, with a range of 27.5 kilometres (17.1 mi).

3: Mid-flight, a time fuze ignites an ejection charge in the nose that pushes the submunitions out of the base of the projectile.

4: The submunitions deploy parachutes and independently fall over the target area while scanning for targets.

5: Once a submunition detects a target vehicle beneath it, it detonates its explosive payload. This creates a high-velocity explosively formed projectile which strikes the target vehicle from above, where the armour is relatively weak, for maximum effect.

== Competing systems ==
US artillery largely deploys the M712 Copperhead laser-guided round for the anti-tank role.

GIWS formed a partnership with US defence contractor Alliant Techsystems, hoping to sell SMArt 155 to the United States armed forces; as of 2002, no sale had been made. The US developed the similar M898 SADARM system (which also descended on a ballute to attack the top surfaces of armoured vehicles), but this was discontinued in favour of the GPS guided M982 Excalibur round.

SMArt 155 is very similar to the 155 BONUS system; BONUS descends on a system of winglets rather than a parachute.

== Operators ==
Map with SMArt 155 operators in blue with former operators in red

=== Current operators ===
As of 2008, 25,000 shells have been sold to various clients.

(United Kingdom) British Army and (Australia) Australian Army
The DM-702 SMArt-155 can be used with the M777 towed howitzer and the AS-90.
The sale of the SMArt-155 took place in 2008 for €120 million, for an estimated 2,000 shells. The share between the UK and Australia isn't public.

(Germany) German Army (9,000)
The DM-702 SMArt-155 is used with the Panzerhaubitze 2000.
9,000 shells were ordered, some of which were used for training, and others were donated to Ukraine. In 2023, the Bundeswehr announced a restart of the production planned, with 10,000 shells expected.

(Greece) Hellenic Army (1,000)
The DM-702 SMArt-155 is used with the Panzerhaubitze 2000
The first 500 shells were ordered in 2002, delivered in 2003, 500 additional shells were ordered in 2003, delivered in 2006.

(Switzerland) Swiss Army (2,000)
The DM-702 SMArt-155 is used with the M109 KAWEST WE.
The order for this shell type was made with the Armament Programme 2001, with most deliveries to take place from 2004 and 2005 for a budget of CHF168 million.

United Arab Emirates Army (11,000)
The American company ATK (Alliant TechSystems) partnered with GIWS to produce shells under license.
Trials in the UAE on the G6 Howitzer took place in 2005 with satisfactory results, and led to the sale of 11,000 shells produced in the USA.

Armed Forces of Ukraine
Supplied by the German Army, used with the Panzerhaubitze 2000

== Controversy about classification as submunition vs cluster munition ==
Various human rights organizations, such as "Aktionsbündnis Landmine.de" and Handicap International view the SMArt 155 as a cluster munition. Germany’s representatives managed to ensure that SMArt 155 did not meet criteria for cluster munition of the Oslo Agreement on the Prohibition of Cluster Bombs. Critics view this exempting definition in contradiction to the United Nations' understanding of cluster munitions. Critics also point out the similar effects of cluster munitions on the civilian population as in the case of unexploded ordnance or mistargeting.

In July 2008, the journalist Stefan Aigner wrote: " Today, Diehl is one of the most successful German arms producers. According to its own information, around one third of its profit of 2.3 billion euros comes from armaments production. Among other things, cluster munitions are produced." Diehl’s lawyers demanded a cease-and-desist declaration from Aigner. The lawyers referred to the exceptions made in the Oslo Agreement, which allegedly pose no danger to civilians. In the trial before the Munich Regional Court, Aigner and Diehl reached a settlement on March 2, 2009, after the judge made it clear that he would accept Diehl’s claim. The settlement includes that Diehl s ammunition may not be referred to as cluster munitions. In return, Diehl assumed the costs of the proceedings.

"Intelligent Working System" came in third place in the election for Unwort des Jahres 2009. Behind the harmless term "intelligent active systems" the jury saw technologically advanced types of ammunition, which are produced by a subsidiary of two armaments companies with the equally disguised company name "Gesellschaft für Intelligente Wirksysteme mbH".
