= M712 Copperhead =

American guided 155 mm howitzer projectile

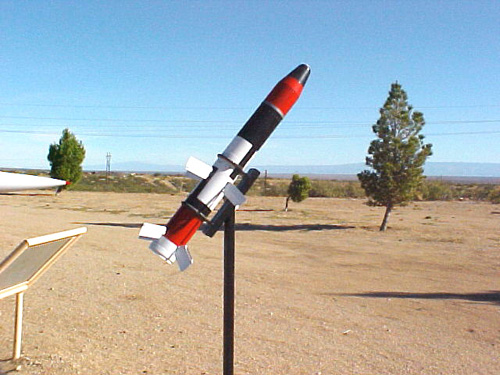
- White Sands Missile Range M712 Copperhead
- Type: Cannon-launched guided projectile
- Place of origin: United States

Service history
- Used by: U.S., Egypt, Jordan, Lebanon, Taiwan, Ukraine

Specifications
- Mass: 62.4 kg (137.6 lb)
- Length: 140 cm (54 in)
- Diameter: 155 mm (6.1 in)
- Caliber: 155 mm (6.1 in)
- Effective firing range: 16 km (9.9 mi)
- Warhead: Composition B
- Warhead weight: 6.69 kilograms (14.75 lb)
- Guidance system: laser guidance

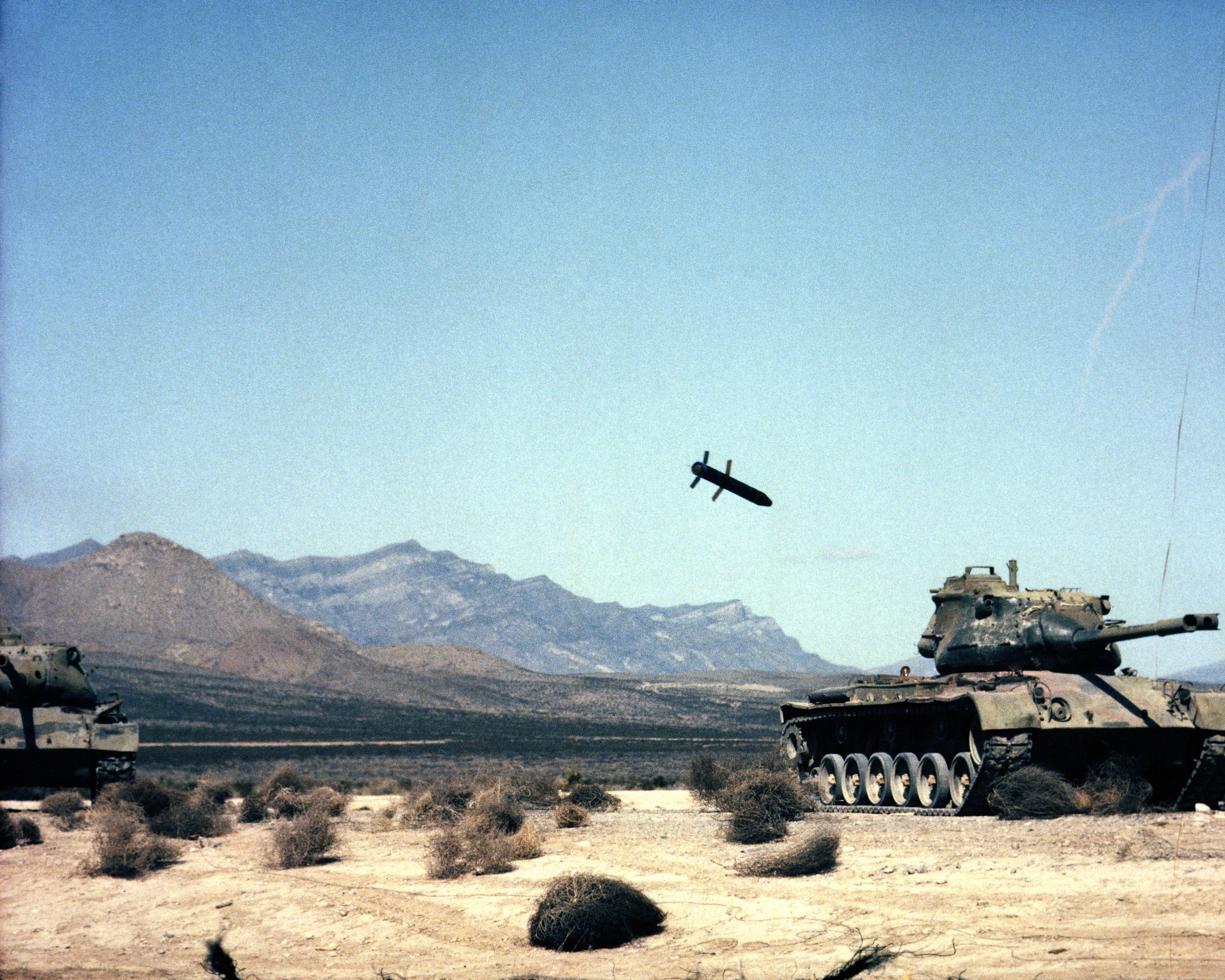
M712 Copperhead approaches an old M47 Patton tank used as a target

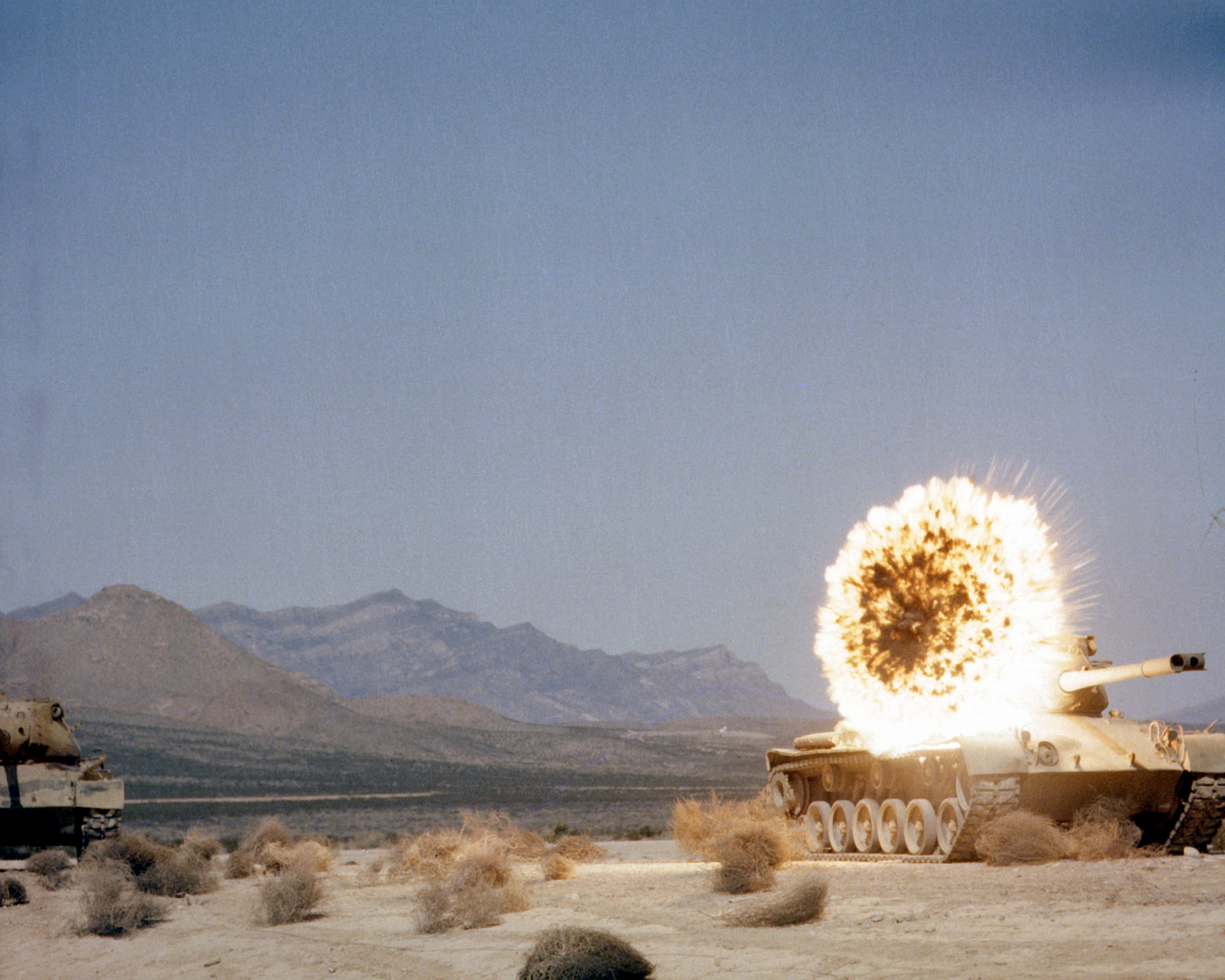
M712 detonating

The M712 Copperhead is a 155 mm caliber cannon-launched guided projectile. It is a fin-stabilized, terminally laser guided, explosive shell intended to engage hard point targets such as tanks, self-propelled howitzers or other high-value targets. It may be fired from different artillery pieces, such as the M114, M109, M198, M777 and CAESAR howitzers. The projectile has a minimum range of 3 km (1.9 mi) and a maximum range of 16 km (9.9 mi).

== Development ==
The concept for Copperhead was originally made in 1970 by engineers at the US Army's Rodman Laboratories, with feasibility studies conducted in 1971. In 1972 development contracts were awarded to Martin Marietta and Texas Instruments. After testing Martin Marietta was chosen for continued development through the 1970s.

Inventories of March 1, 1995:
User	Usable	Unusable	Total
US Army	16,095	0	16,095
USMC	1,873	894	2,767

== Description ==
At 62.4 kilograms (137.6 lb) and 140 centimetres (54 in) long, Copperhead is longer and heavier than traditional 155mm ammunition.

The warhead assembly consists of a shaped charge loaded with 6.69 kilograms (14.75 lb) of Composition B.

For Copperhead to function, the target must be illuminated with a laser designator. Once the laser signal is detected, the on-board guidance system will operate the steering vanes to maneuver the projectile to the target. The Copperhead targeting logic is designed to ensure (1) that the optical system will always be able to detect the target, and (2) that once the target has been detected there will be sufficient time and velocity to maneuver to hit the target. Copperhead must be below any cloud cover at critical parts of the trajectory, and there must be sufficient visibility to ensure that when the target is acquired the projectile will have sufficient time to maneuver.

== Modes of operation ==
Cross section of M712 Copperhead

Copperhead has two modes of operation: ballistic mode and glide mode. Ballistic mode is used where the cloud ceiling is high and visibility is good. When the projectile is 3,000 m (9,800 ft) from the target, the guidance vanes extend, the target is acquired, and then the on-board guidance system adjusts the guidance vanes to maneuver onto the target.

Glide mode is used when the cloud ceiling and/or the visibility is too low to permit the use of the ballistic mode. A glide mode trajectory consists of two phases: a ballistic phase and a glide phase. At a predetermined point along the trajectory, the guidance vanes extend and there is a transition from ballistic phase to glide phase. Glide phase targeting logic is designed to ensure the largest possible angle of fall permitted by the cloud cover and the visibility. The target is acquired when the projectile is close enough to detect the laser illumination or when the projectile emerges from the cloud cover, whichever event occurs later in the trajectory. When a trajectory solution has been obtained, time-to-target and terminal velocity are checked to ensure that there will be enough time to maneuver and that the projectile is aerodynamically stable—that it will not stall while maneuvering.

Initially the laser designation was intended to be performed by the MQM-105 Aquila pilotless drone.

== Combat history ==
Copperhead was used in Operation Desert Storm, with 90 rounds fired against hardened Iraqi fortifications and radar stations. One of these strikes caused an Iraqi unit to surrender.

Lebanese Armed Forces fired several hundred Copperhead shells at ISIL targets in east Lebanon during the Qalamoun offensive (July–August 2017). At least five technicals, five occupied buildings, and several troop formations were struck with precision. In 2018 the US delivered 827 Copperhead shells to the Lebanese Armed Forces in an aid package alongside Bradley fighting vehicles and MK19 40mm grenade launchers.

Ukraine's military confirmed employing Copperhead shells to strike a Russian communications tower in Kursk in November 2024, and a command bunker in Kherson 2025.

== Operators ==
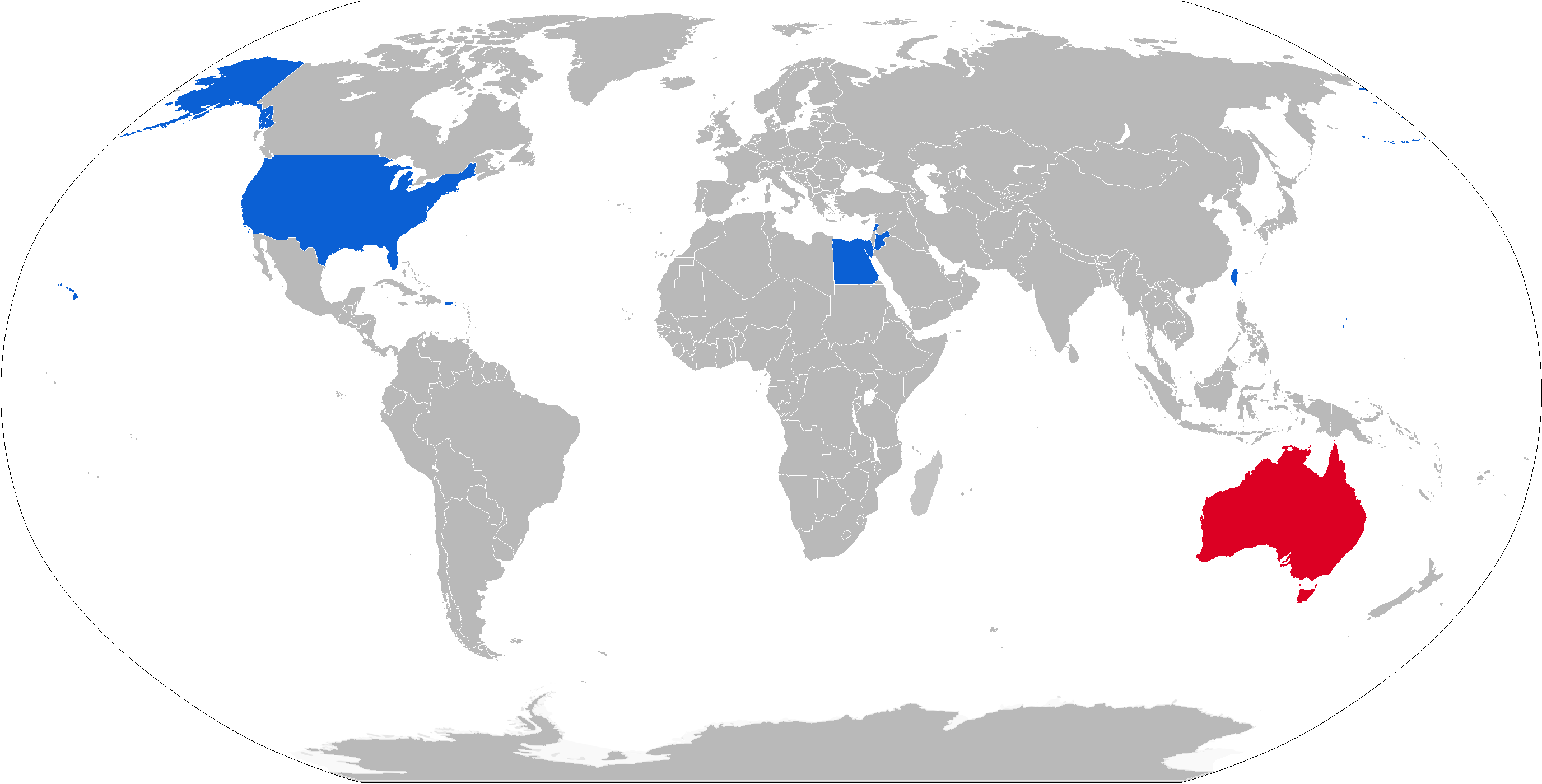
Operators: Current Former

=== Current operators ===
- United States
- Egypt
- Jordan
- Lebanon
- Taiwan
- Ukraine

=== Former operators ===
- Australia – now replaced by SMArt 155.

== See also ==
- Bofors/Nexter Bonus – (Sweden, France)
- Bofors STRIX – (Sweden)
- Krasnopol – (Russia, Soviet Union)
- M982 Excalibur – (United States, Sweden)
- M1156 precision guidance kit – (United States)
- XM395 precision guided mortar munition – (United States)

== Sources ==
- Yenne, William, Yenne, Bill, Attack of the Drones: A History of Unmanned Aerial Combat, Zenith Imprint, 2004 ISBN 0-7603-1825-5
- Nulk, Robert A.; Pastricky, Harold L.; Morrison, Phillip A. (1979). "Copperhead Semiactive Laser Guidance System Development". Journal of Guidance and Control. 2 (5): 374–381. doi:10.2514/3.55892. ISSN 0162-3192.
