= Low Cost Miniature Cruise Missile =

The Low Cost Miniature Cruise Missile (LCMCM) is a Lockheed Martin program to develop a small, affordable cruise missile which will fit inside the internal weapons bay of the F-22 Raptor and F-35 Lightning II.

== Specifications ==
- Length: ~144 in.
- Weight: ~1,000 lbs
- Range: 750–1,000 miles

== See also ==
- Surveilling Miniature Attack Cruise Missile
