= Low Cost Autonomous Attack System =

LOCAAS
- Artist conception of LOCAAS
- Type: loitering munition
- Place of origin: United States

Production history
- Manufacturer: Lockheed Martin

Specifications
- Mass: 100 pounds (45 kg)
- Length: 36 inches (91 cm)
- Wingspan: 3 ft 10.5 in (1.181 m)
- Warhead: Explosively formed projectile
- Warhead weight: 17 lb (7.7 kg)
- Engine: Technical Directions TDI-J45G turbojet 30 lbf (0.13 kN) thrust
- Operational range: over 100 mi (160 km); 30 minute loiter time
- Flight altitude: 750 feet (230 m)
- Maximum speed: 230 miles per hour (370 km/h)
- Guidance system: GPS/inertial midcourse LADAR terminal
- Launch platform: Bomber aircraft; MGM-140 missiles

The Low Cost Autonomous Attack System (LOCAAS) was a loitering attack munition developed for the United States Air Force (USAF). In 1998 the USAF and U.S. Army Lockheed Martin began to examine the feasibility of a small, affordable cruise missile weapon for use against armoured and unarmoured vehicles, materiel and personnel, and if so develop a demonstration program. The program cost approximately $150,000,000; the cost per unit was calculated to be $30,000 based on a production of 12,000 units before cancellation.

After being launched from a weapon platform, it is guided by GPS/INS to the target general area, where it can loiter. A laser radar (LIDAR or LADAR) illuminates the targets, determines their range, and matches their 3-D geometry with pre-loaded signatures. The LOCAAS system then selects the highest priority target and selects the warhead's mode for the best effect.

The LOCAAS program was cancelled.

== Specifications ==
- Weight: 100 lb (45 kg)
- Length: 36 in (910 mm)
- Speed: 200 knots (370 km/h)
- Search altitude: 750 ft (230 m)
- Footprint: 25 sq nmi (86 km^{2})
- Motor: 30 lbf (130 N) thrust class turbojet.
- Range: >100 nmi (190 km)
- Loiter time: 30 min max.
- Guidance: GPS/INS with LADAR terminal seeker
- Warhead: 7.7 kg (17 lb) multi-mode explosively formed projectile (long rod penetrator, aerostable slug or fragmentation)

== See also ==
- Vertical Launch Autonomous Attack System (VLAAS)
- Surveilling Miniature Attack Cruise Missile
- GBU-53/B Small Diameter Bomb II
