= TM-83 mine =

Anti-tank mine

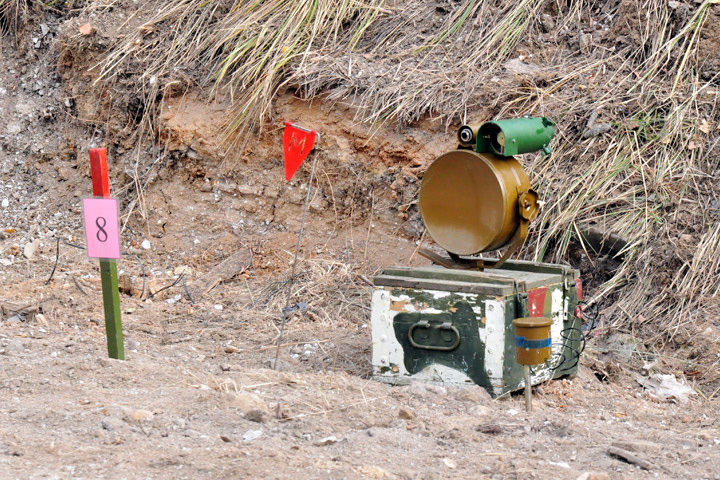
ТМ-83 mine in a training area

The TM-83 is a Soviet off-route anti-tank mine with a shaped charge, developed in 1983, and first shown publicly in 1993. The mine utilises the Misznay Schardin effect to create an armour-penetrating projectile, and is activated using its infrared and seismic sensors.

== Deployment ==
The mine can be installed on soil, or be attached to various objects only manually. The mine is generally positioned 5 meters from the road, and it is intended to attack and aimed using an integrated sight.

The TM-83 can be deployed in two operation modes – autonomous or controlled. The primary difference is that the controlled version has a 100-meter-long wire attached, allowing the operator to switch it through its various modes repeatedly (safe or active, see § Action). If the mine is controlled, it can be switched to its safety mode and be easily removed; however, if the mine is in its autonomous mode, it is considered impossible to remove due to the high sensitivity of the seismic sensor and the chance that the mine will be set off by the infrared emissions of the human body 10 meters from any direction. If the engineer desired to destroy the mine in its autonomous mode, then it is only possible with large caliber machine gun fire.

The mine installation by two trained personnel takes 15–20 minutes.

== Action ==
The mine has two modes of operation after deployment: using its infrared or seismic sensors, which can be classified as "active" and "passive" respectively. The seismic sensor allows the mine to work in "standby" mode and requires less power to run, as the mine has a set of batteries, and, thus, a limited energy source. As soon as the seismic sensor detects an approaching target, the mine switches to its "active" mode, toggling the use of its infrared sensor. The mine explodes when the target enters the range of detection by the infrared sensor. At a range of 5–30 meters, the mine is claimed to penetrate 100 mm of armour at 30° LOS, creating a hole 80 mm in diameter. If no target was detected by the infrared sensor three minutes after the infrared sensor is activated, the mine switches back to its "standby" mode.

== Specifications ==
- Weight
  - Full assembly: 28.1 kg
  - Mine: 20.4 kg
  - Detonator: 2.7 kg
  - Charge: 9.6 kg of TG 40/60
- Dimensions: 45.5 x 37.7x44 cm
- Shelf life: 10 years
- Temperature range of use: -30 to +50 °С
- Action time: 30 days until a battery change is required
- Sensor sensitivity
  - Seismic sensor: 200–250 m (tank)
  - Infrared sensor: 90–120 m (tank)
- Body: steel
- Weather limitations: fog, heavy snowfall, or heavy rain with visibility below 50 m

== See also ==
- PFM-1
- PMN mine
- PTM-3 mine
