= M303 Special Operations Forces demolition kit =

Explosive weapons kit

The M303 Special Operations Forces demolition kit is a kit containing various metal and plastic parts which the SOF operator packs with C4 explosive to produce a shaped charge or an explosively formed penetrator. The kit also contains a tripod and sights for aiming the explosive device.
