= MAHEM =

Experimental armor piercing weapon

The Magneto Hydrodynamic Explosive Munition (MAHEM) is a weapon being developed by DARPA of the United States Department of Defense that would utilize molten metal to penetrate enemy armor. The molten metal would be propelled by electromagnetic fields from explosions. The munition would be delivered to a target as a warhead "packaged into a missile, projectile or other platform." It would penetrate the armor of an enemy vehicle then explode when it gets inside, destroying the vehicle from the inside out. DARPA predicts the weapon will have greater efficiency, control, and precision than conventional explosively formed penetrators.

It is driven by a compressed magnetic flux generator (CMFG).
