= Surveilling Miniature Attack Cruise Missile =

The Surveilling Miniature Attack Cruise Missile (SMACM) is a long range, high endurance, expendable, unmanned aerial vehicle (UAV) under development by Lockheed Martin. It is equipped with a two-way datalink and is designed to reconnoitre a target area and if necessary engage targets with its weapon system.

== Specifications ==
- Weight: 142 lb
- Length: 70.5 in
- Engine: Type J45G turbojet.
- Range: > 200 nautical miles (370 km)
- Seeker:
  - "Tri-Mode" - millimeter wave (MMW) RF radar, imaging infrared (IIR), and a semi active laser (SAL) or
  - "Tri-Star" - MMW, active LADAR, and SAL.
- Payload: Four Low Cost Autonomous Attack System missiles.

== See also ==
- Low Cost Miniature Cruise Missile
