= SADARM =

US 'smart' anti-tank submunition

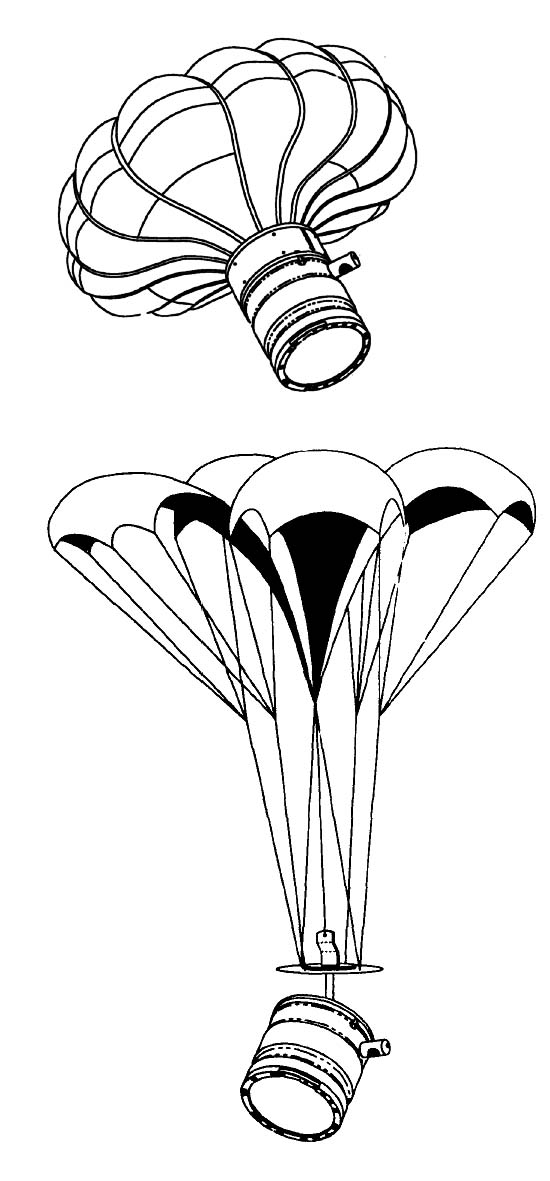
SADARM submunition (top) ram air parachute deployed (bottom) vortex ring parachute deployed

Project Sense and Destroy Armor, or SADARM, is a United States 'smart' submunition capable of searching for, and destroying tanks within a given target area.

== History ==
=== Beginnings ===
SADARM development can be traced back to the early 1960s. The original platform for the submunition was the 203 mm M509 Improved Conventional Munition (ICM) projectile, and the concept was demonstrated in the late 1970s. By 1983 the project shifted focus to 155 mm caliber and the target set was changed to self-propelled howitzers and other lightly armored vehicles. With approval for engineering development in 1986 the scope was expanded to include larger diameter submunitions in M270 Multiple Launch Rocket System (MLRS) rockets.

Several successful live-fire tests were conducted in 1989, and production was scheduled for 1994; however, pre-production samples tested in 1993 gave poor results with only nine out of 42 submunitions hitting their targets. Fixes were applied and further testing resulted in 11 hits from 13 submunitions.

Low-rate production began in 1995, with further testing successfully conducted in April 1996. Low-rate production continued with a total of 836 projectiles produced, most being expended in various operational tests. With the target threat (howitzers) removed from probable conflict areas due to the collapse of the Soviet Union the SADARM program was terminated prior to full-rate production.

== Description ==
The M898 155 mm SADARM shell is fired from a normal 155 mm artillery gun, with a nose-mounted M762/M767 fuze set to burst at 1,000 m above the target to release two SADARM submunitions. Once the submunition is ejected from the projectile, an initial ram-air parachute opens to de-spin and slow the submunition. A second "vortex ring" parachute then deploys to slowly spin the submunition, suspending it at approximately 30° from the vertical. As it spins, its sensors sweep a decreasing spiral track beneath the submunition to scan an area about 150 m in diameter. The sensors consist of a millimeter-wave radar, a passive millimeter-wave radiometer and an infrared telescope. A magnetometer is used as an aid in arming and aiming. When the submunition detects a target, its 1.5 kg LX-14 explosive charge is detonated to project an explosively formed penetrator that has enough energy to penetrate the thin top armor of most main battle tanks up to a range of around 152 m. If the submunition reaches the ground before it finds a target it self-destructs. However, exact penetration power is not listed, being classified in nature.

The submunition was also intended to be used in MLRS rockets, with four or six being carried.

== Combat history ==
The system was used for the first time during combat during the 2003 Invasion of Iraq, with a total of 121 rounds reported fired by the 3rd Infantry Division with 48 vehicle kills attributed to 108 M898 SADARM projectiles.

== Specifications ==
- Projectile M898
  - Weight: 44 kg
  - Length: 805 mm
  - Caliber: 155 mm
  - Range (fired from M109A6): 22,500 m
- SADARM submunition
  - Weight: 11.77 kg
  - Warhead: 1.5 kg LX-14
  - Length: 204.4 mm
  - Diameter: 147 mm
  - Descent rate: 17 m/s
  - Scan rate: 456 rpm

== Similar systems ==
- SMArt 155 – (Germany)
- Bofors/Nexter 155 Bonus – (Sweden, France)
- 9M55K1 – (Soviet Union)
