= Explosively formed penetrator =

Shaped charge designed to penetrate armor effectively

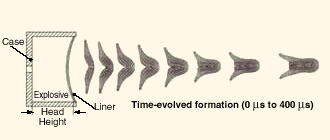
Aerodynamic development of the metal plate of an explosively formed penetrator (EFP) munition, a few microseconds after the detonation of the explosive charge.

An explosively formed penetrator (EFP) – also known as an explosively formed projectile, a self-forging warhead, or a self-forging fragment – is a special type of shaped charge relying on the Misnay–Schardin effect, designed to penetrate armour effectively, from a much greater standoff range than standard shaped charges, which are more limited by standoff distance. As the name suggests, the effect of the explosive charge is to deform a metal plate into a slug or rod shape and accelerate it toward a target. They were first developed as oil well perforators by American oil companies in the 1930s, and were deployed as weapons in World War II.

== Difference from conventional shaped charges ==
A conventional shaped charge generally has a conical metal liner that is forced by an explosive blast into a hypervelocity jet of superplastic metal able to penetrate thick armour and knock out vehicles. A disadvantage of this arrangement is that the jet of metal loses effectiveness the further it travels, as it breaks up into disconnected particles that drift out of alignment.

Formation of an EFP (3D animation).

An EFP operates on the same general principle, but its liner is designed to form not a jet of particles but a single compact, high-velocity projectile (commonly called the slug), permitting it to penetrate armour at greater distance: up to a hundred meters for a practical device. The liner is usually a thick, heavy plate of ductile metal such as copper, tantalum, iron or mild steel, having a plate/dish shape, or cone-shaped with an internal apex angle greater than 100°. The dish-shaped liner of an EFP can also generate a number of distinct projectile forms, depending on the shape of the plate and how the explosive is detonated. The high-explosive charge, pressed evenly against the convex side of the liner/plate, has approximately the same weight of the liner/plate. The concave side of the liner/plate is aimed at the target.

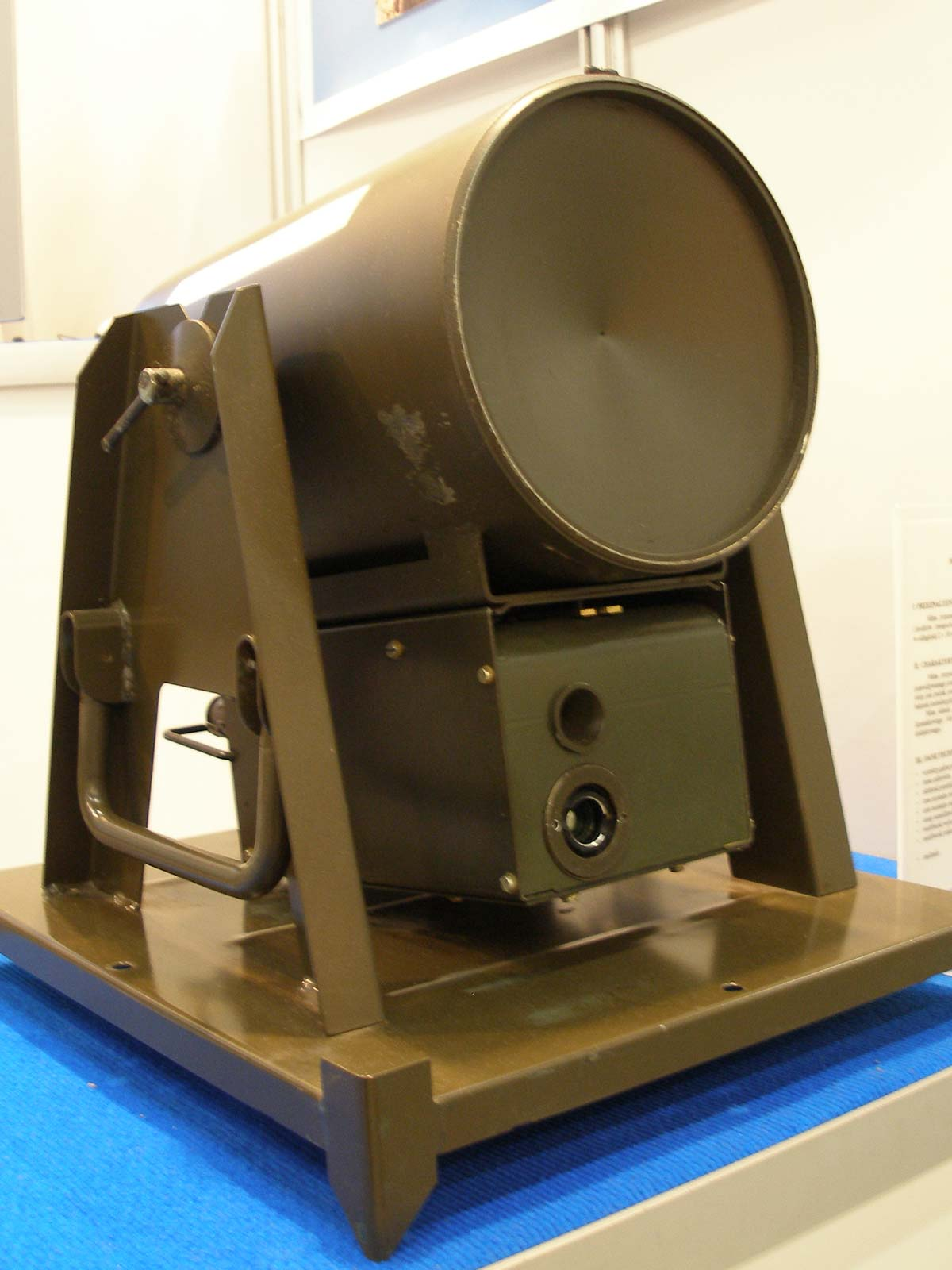
MPB mine showing the face of its explosively formed penetrator.

An EFP's penetration is more strongly affected by the density of its liner metal compared to a conventional shaped charge. At 16.654 g/cm^{3}, tantalum is preferable in delivery systems that have limitations in size, like the SADARM, which is delivered by a howitzer. For other weapon systems without practical limitations on warhead diameter, a less expensive copper liner (8.960 g/cm^{3}) of double the diameter can be used instead.

Typically, EFPs produce large holes in the target material, and the optimal penetration depth is usually about 1 to 2 charge diameters (CD) into steel targets – at the appropriate standoff distance, if the projectile is aerodynamically stable and do not tumble. By contrast, a typical conventional shaped charge can penetrate up to 6 charge diameters into steel targets; precision-made shaped charges can reach a depth of penetration of 8–10 charge diameters or more.

Some sophisticated EFP warheads have multiple detonators that can be fired in different arrangements causing different types of waveform in the explosive, resulting in either a long-rod penetrator, an aerodynamic slug projectile, or multiple high-velocity fragments. A less sophisticated approach for changing the formation of an EFP is the use of wire mesh in front of the liner, which causes the liner to fragment into multiple penetrators.

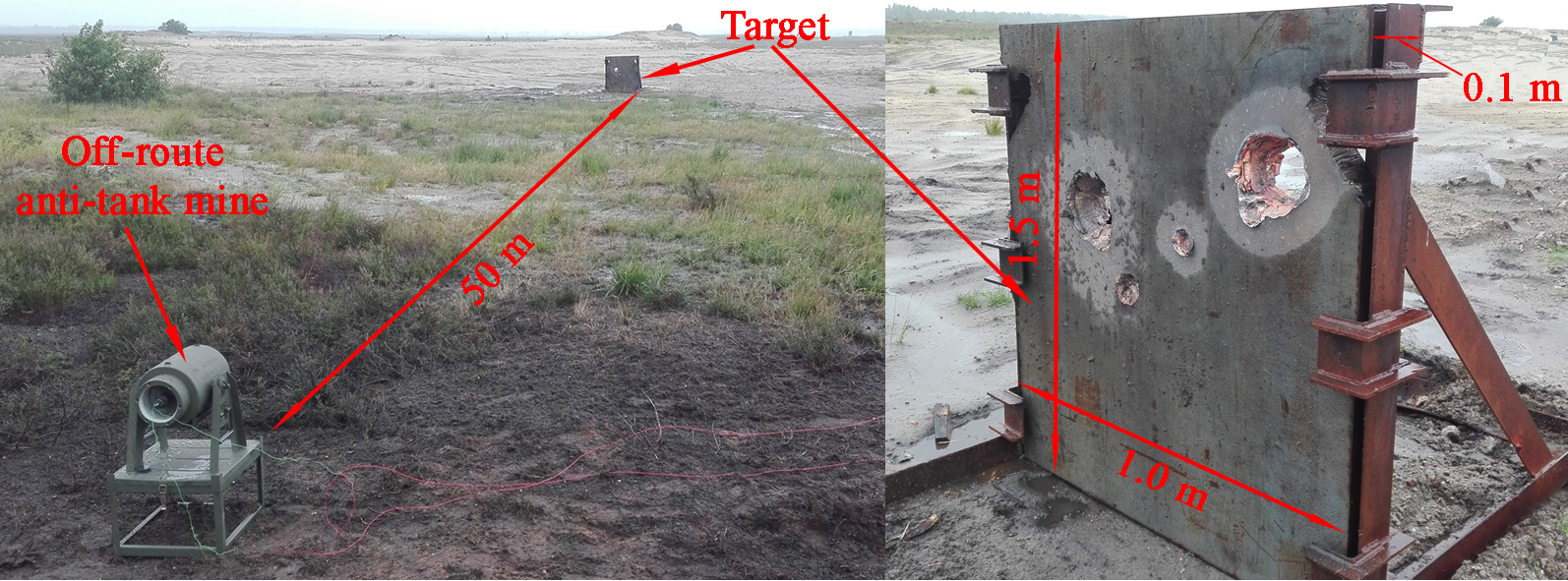
A 10 cm thick ARMOX 370T armoured steel plate, penetrated by an MPB off-route anti-tank mine equipped with an EFP warhead, positioned 50 metres away and fired horizontally.

In addition to single-penetrator EFPs (also called single EFPs or SEFPs), there are EFP warheads whose liners are designed to produce more than one penetrator; these are known as multiple EFPs, or MEFPs. The liner of an MEFP generally comprises a number of dimples that intersect each other at sharp angles. Upon detonation, the liner fragments along these intersections to form up to dozens of small, generally spheroidal projectiles, producing an effect similar to that of a shotgun. The pattern of impacts on a target can be finely controlled based on the design of the liner and the manner in which the explosive charge is detonated. A nuclear-driven MEFP was apparently proposed by a member of the JASON group in 1966 for terminal ballistic missile defense. A related device was the proposed nuclear pulse propulsion unit for Project Orion.

Extensive research is going on in the zone between jetting charges and EFPs, which combines the advantages of both types, resulting in very long stretched-rod EFPs for short-to-medium distances (because of the lack of aerostability) with improved penetration capability.

EFPs have been adopted as warheads in a number of weapon systems, including the CBU-97 and BLU-108 air bombs (with the Skeet submunition), the M303 Special Operations Forces demolition kit, the M2/M4 Selectable Lightweight Attack Munition (SLAM), the SADARM submunition, the SMArt 155 top-attack artillery round, the Low Cost Autonomous Attack System, the TOW-2B anti-tank missile, and the NASM-SR anti-ship missile.

An EFP eight inches [20 cm] in diameter threw a seven-pound [3 kg] copper slug at Mach 6, or 2,000 meters per second. (A .50-caliber bullet, among the most devastating projectiles on the battlefield, weighs less than two ounces [57 g] and has a muzzle velocity of 900 meters per second.)

— Rick Atkinson, The Washington Post

== Use in improvised explosive devices ==
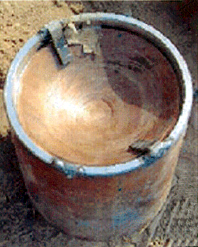
An improvised explosive device (IED) in Iraq. When activated, the concave shape copper plate on top becomes an explosively formed penetrator.

EFPs have been used in improvised explosive devices (IEDs) against armoured cars, for example in the 1989 assassination of German banker Alfred Herrhausen, attributed to the Red Army Faction. Improvised EFPs have also been used by Hezbollah and Hamas (Al-Qassam Brigades), against armoured vehicles such as tanks, starting from the 1990s and 2000s respectively. They saw widespread use in IEDs by insurgents in Iraq against coalition vehicles. As the occupation forces became more sophisticated in interrupting radio signals around their convoys, the insurgents adapted their triggering methods and the British accused Iran and Hezbollah of teaching Iraqi fighters to use infrared light beams to trigger IEDs. In 2005, however, it emerged that these "advanced" IEDs were actually old IRA technology. The infrared beam method was perfected by the IRA in the early 1990s after it acquired the technology from a botched undercover British Army operation. Many of the IEDs being used against the invading coalition forces in Iraq were originally developed by the British Army who unintentionally passed the information on to the IRA, who in turn taught their techniques to the Palestine Liberation Organization.

The charges are generally cylindrical, fabricated from commonly available metal pipe, with the forward end closed by a concave copper or steel disk-shaped liner to create a shaped charge. Explosive is loaded behind the metal liner to fill the pipe. Upon detonation, the explosive projects the liner to form a projectile.

The effects of traditional explosions like blast-forces and metal fragments seldom disable armored vehicles, but the explosively formed solid copper penetrator is quite lethal—even to the new generation of mine-resistant vehicles (which are made to withstand an anti-tank mine), and many tanks.

Often mounted on crash barriers at window level, they are placed along roadsides at choke points where vehicles must slow down, such as intersections and junctions. This gives the operator time to judge the moment to fire, when the vehicle is moving more slowly.

Detonation is controlled by cable, radio control, TV or IR remote controls, or remote arming with a passive infrared sensor, or via a pair of ordinary cell phones. EFPs can be deployed singly, in pairs, or in arrays, depending on the tactical situation.

=== Non-circular explosively formed penetrators ===
Non-circular explosively formed penetrators can be formed based on modifications to the liner construction. For instance, U.S. patents 6606951 and 4649828 are non-circular in design. US6606951B1 is designed to launch multiple asymmetric explosively forged penetrators horizontally in 360 degrees. US4649828A is designed to form several clothespin shaped EFPs, increasing hit probability.

In addition, a simplified EFP (SIM-EFP) can be made using a rectangular liner, similar to a linear shaped charge or modified platter charge. This design can be further modified to be similar to US4649828A with multiple cut and bent steel bars lined side by side instead of a singular liner.

In Northern Ireland similar devices have been discovered that were developed by dissident Republican groups for intended use against the police. In Northern Ireland, the weapon was first used in March 2014 when a PSNI Land Rover was targeted as it travelled along the Falls Road in west Belfast. A police car was destroyed by an EFP detonated by a command wire in Strabane, Co Tyrone on 18 November 2022.

== Asteroid impactor ==
The spacecraft Hayabusa2 carried a small carry-on impactor. It was dropped off Hayabusa2 on to an asteroid and detonated. The explosion created a copper explosively formed penetrator, which hit the asteroid with a velocity of 2 km/s. The crater created by the impact was a target for further observations by the onboard instruments. The shaped charge consisted of 4.5 kg of plasticized HMX and a 2.5 kg copper liner.

This approach will be used again on Tianwen-2 mission.

== See also ==
- High-explosive anti-tank
- MAHEM
- Misnay–Schardin effect
- Munroe effect
- TMRP-6 (landmine which uses an EFP)
