= Misnay–Schardin effect =

Characteristic of the detonation of a broad sheet of explosive

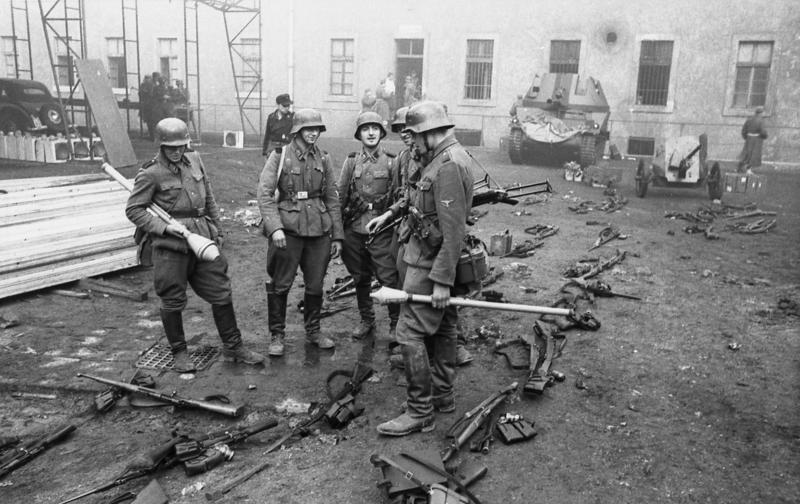
44M LŐTAK EFP mines at the upper left corner of the picture. Taken on 15 October 1944, Operation Panzerfaust, after surrender and disarmament of the royal guards of the Hungarian Army

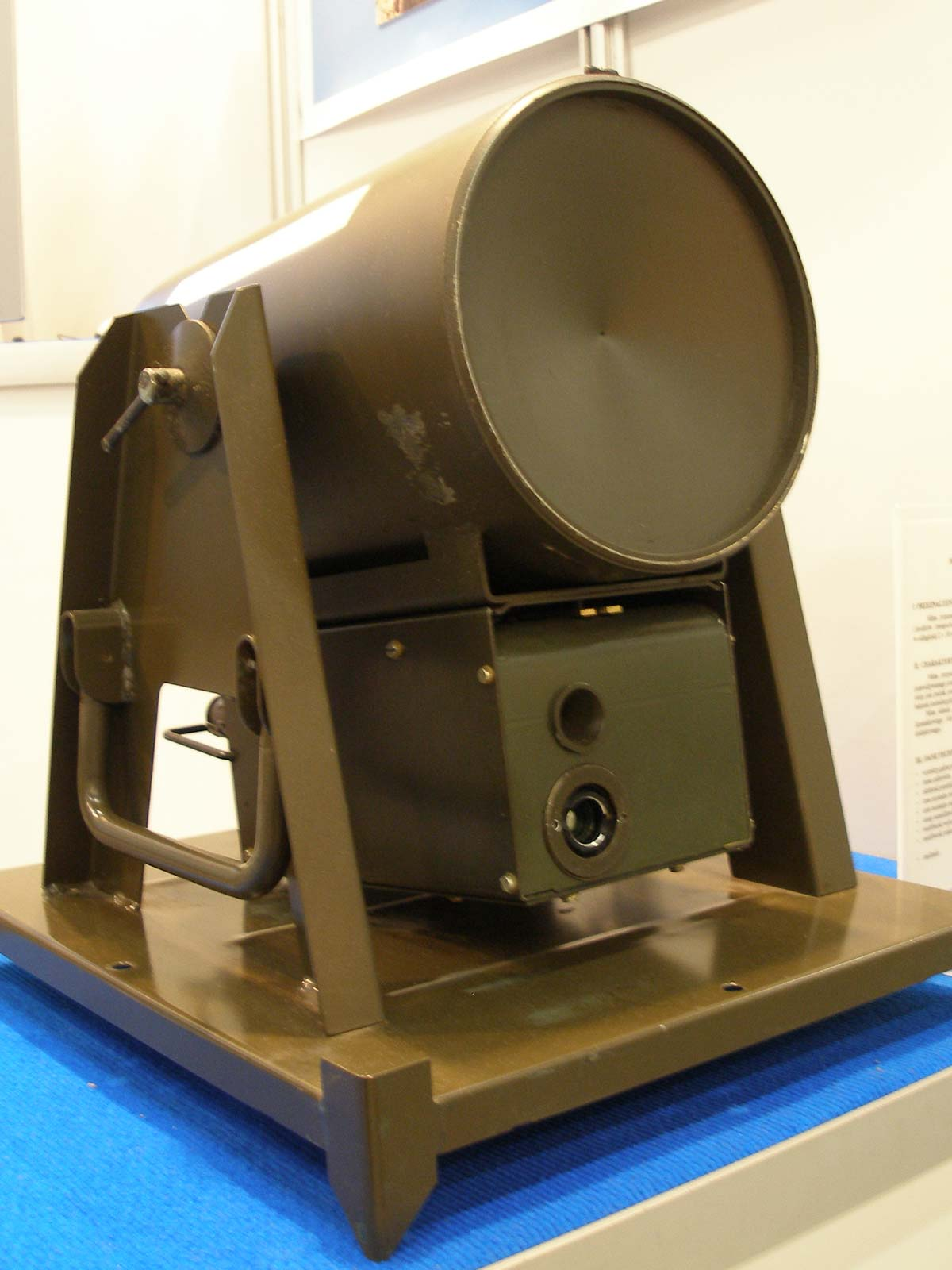
MPB mine showing a cylindrical, concave Misnay–Schardin warhead

The Misnay–Schardin effect, or platter effect, is a characteristic of the detonation of a broad sheet of explosive.

== Description ==
Explosive blasts expand directly away from, and perpendicular to, the surface of an explosive. Unlike the blast from a rounded explosive charge, which expands in all directions, the blast produced by an explosive sheet expands primarily perpendicular to its plane, in both directions. However, if one side is backed by a heavy or fixed mass, most of the blast (i.e. most of the rapidly expanding gas and its kinetic energy) will be reflected in the direction away from the mass.

== Uses ==
The Misnay–Schardin effect was studied and experimented with by explosive experts József Misnay (sometimes spelled Misznay incorrectly), a Hungarian, and Hubert Schardin, a German, who initially sought to develop a more effective antitank mine for Nazi Germany. Some sources claim that World War II ended before their design became usable, but they and others continued their work. Misnay designed two weapons: the 43M TAK antitank mine and the 44M LŐTAK side-attack mine. The Hungarian army used these weapons in 1944–1945.

The later AT2 and M18 Claymore mines rely on this effect.

== See also ==
- High-explosive squash head
- Explosively formed penetrator
- Munroe effect
- M93 Hornet mine
