= XM395 precision guided mortar munition =

American GPS-guided 120 mm projectile

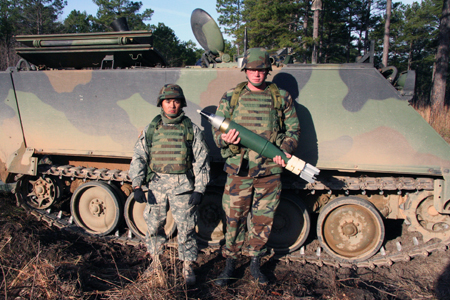
- XM395 precision guided mortar munition prototype at Fort Benning, Ga., Feb 2006
- Type: GPS-guided mortar shell
- Place of origin: United States

Service history
- Used by: U.S. Army
- Wars: War in Afghanistan

Production history
- Manufacturer: Alliant Techsystems (ATK)
- Unit cost: $24,469.16 (FY2012; equivalent to $34,315 in 2025)
- Produced: 2011

Specifications
- Cartridge: M934 high-explosive
- Caliber: 120 mm (12 cm)
- Effective firing range: 7,000 m (4.3 mi)
- Guidance system: GPS
- Accuracy: 10 m (33 ft)

The XM395 precision guided mortar munition (PGMM) is a 120 mm guided mortar round developed by Alliant Techsystems.

== Design ==
Based on Orbital ATK's precision guidance kit for 155 mm artillery projectiles, XM395 combines GPS guidance and directional control surfaces into a package that replaces standard fuzes, transforming existing 120 mm mortar bodies into precision-guided munitions. The XM395 munition consists of a GPS-guided kit fitted to standard 120 mm smoothbore mortar rounds that includes the fitting of a nose and tail subsystem containing the maneuvering parts.

== History ==
The U.S. Army began seeking a guided mortar in response to fighting conditions experienced during the War in Afghanistan. Taliban fighters often engaged troops in small unit actions from prepared fighting positions on ridgelines and high ground. These types of ambushes offered limited exposure targets to direct fire weapons, and close air support was limited by the rules of engagement and bad weather. Troops also spotted Taliban movements along distant ridgelines or valleys but didn't have the range with direct fire weapons to engage them. Because of this, the Army started the Accelerated Precision Mortar Initiative (APMI) from an urgent operational needs statement in February 2009 to create a GPS-guided 120 mm mortar with accuracy of 5 m (16 ft) CEP at 7,000 m (4.3 mi); because APMI was an urgent request, it was accelerated by an other transaction authority rather the traditional acquisition process. GPS was chosen over laser designation as the guidance system because the enemy frequently ducked down behind ridges and rock outcroppings, so laser designation would have limited ability to target them, while a GPS round could give accurate targeting even when taking cover behind obstacles. In April 2010, the Army announced that ATK had won a competitive shoot-off during the winter against competitors Raytheon and General Dynamics, and been selected to provide a new precision-guided mortar under the APMI needs statement.

Soldiers of an infantry brigade combat team received the first APMI cartridges in March 2011, with plans to field them in all seven deployed IBCTs within six months. The first shell was fired on 26 March by Company C, 1-506th Infantry, 4th Brigade Combat Team, 101st Airborne Division, which landed four meters from the target. Heavy mortars are traditionally employed at battalion-level for immediate fire suppression and support, but they were the primary indirect fire weapon available to remote forward operating bases, so guided mortars gave a battalion commander accurate artillery fire without needing to request an M982 Excalibur from a brigade-level howitzer. The ATK XM395 PGMM cartridge uses a standard M934 high-explosive 120 mm projectile body with a GPS receiver in the nose and computer-controlled aerodynamic directional fins for stability and to keep it on the programmed trajectory. It has a multi-mode airburst, point detonation, and delay fuse. Unguided 120 mm mortars have an accuracy of 136 m (446 ft) at maximum range, which can be reduced to 76 m (249 ft) with precision position and pointing systems. The PGMM can hit within 10 meters of a target, and often hits within four, making it seven times more accurate. Although not designed to replace unguided mortars, the PGMM allows mortar teams to eliminate point targets that would require 8-10 rounds using one or two. This makes a typical team with 25 rounds able to operate for a longer time and increases the number of targets it can engage without needing resupply. It also expands potential target zones that previously required soldiers to clear because inaccurate artillery would cause collateral damage since insurgents deliberately attacked from populated areas hoping troops wouldn't risk civilian casualties. In FY2012, the XM395 was procured at a unit price of $24,469.16 (equivalent to $34,315 in 2025), much less than the guided Excalibur 155 mm shell. There is also no current requirement for guidance for 60 mm or 81 mm mortars.

In July 2012, the Army announced the fielding of APMI precision mortar to Stryker brigade combat teams in Afghanistan. Previously, the rounds were fielded by dismounted troops stationed on combat outposts. When paired with the M1129 Stryker double-V-hull mortar carrier vehicle (MCVV) mobile platform, it increases the battlespace where the guided rounds can be used.

The Army bought 5,480 mortar guidance kits in response to an operational needs statement in Afghanistan, sometimes hitting as close as 2.2 meters from the target. With the success of the XM395, the Army is seeking a guided 120 mm mortar Program of Record with comparable accuracy through the High Explosive Guided Mortar (HEGM) proposal. Deliveries would not take place until around 2020, so ATK is pushing to continue orders of the XM395 to avoid an inventory gap if a contingency arises. HEGM seeks to improve upon APMI through increased range, reliability, and lethality. The Army developed its own HEGM prototype called the Guided Enhanced Fragmentation Mortar (GEFM), which will be made available to industry when a request for proposals is released to industry to offer their own smart mortar solutions. The HEGM program objective is to create a round accurate to within one meter CEP, with dual GPS/SAL guidance to hit targets that have relocated and to function in a GPS-degraded environment. The Army closed its initial solicitation period for designs in January 2017 and plans to award multiple contracts by the end of the year, leading to an open competition in 2018 and production beginning in 2021 with 14,000 HEGM rounds to be produced.

== Program status ==
- December 2004: Alliant Techsystems regains an $80 million contract from the U.S. Army to begin production on the XM395 precision-guided mortar munition after a protest by Lockheed Martin a year previously.
- January 2006: Successfully completed the preliminary design review (PDR) stage.
- February 2006: Successful ballistic flight test at Yuma Proving Grounds.
- February 2007: Funding for program withdrawn in proposed FY2008 budget.
- March 2007: Successful guided flight test.
- April 2010: ATK's XM395 wins the U.S. Army's competition for the preferred mortar guidance kit.
- March 2011: XM395 munition kit makes its combat debut in Afghanistan.

=== Export customer – Singapore Army ===
In March 2017, the U.S. approved the sale of 2,000 XM395 APMI rounds to Singapore.

== See also ==
- Bofors STRIX – (Sweden)
- GMM 120 – (Israel)
- M982 Excalibur – (United States, Sweden)
- M1156 precision guidance kit – (United States)
- Mortier 120mm Rayé Tracté Modèle F1 – (France)
