= Monster Mortar =

Monster mortar
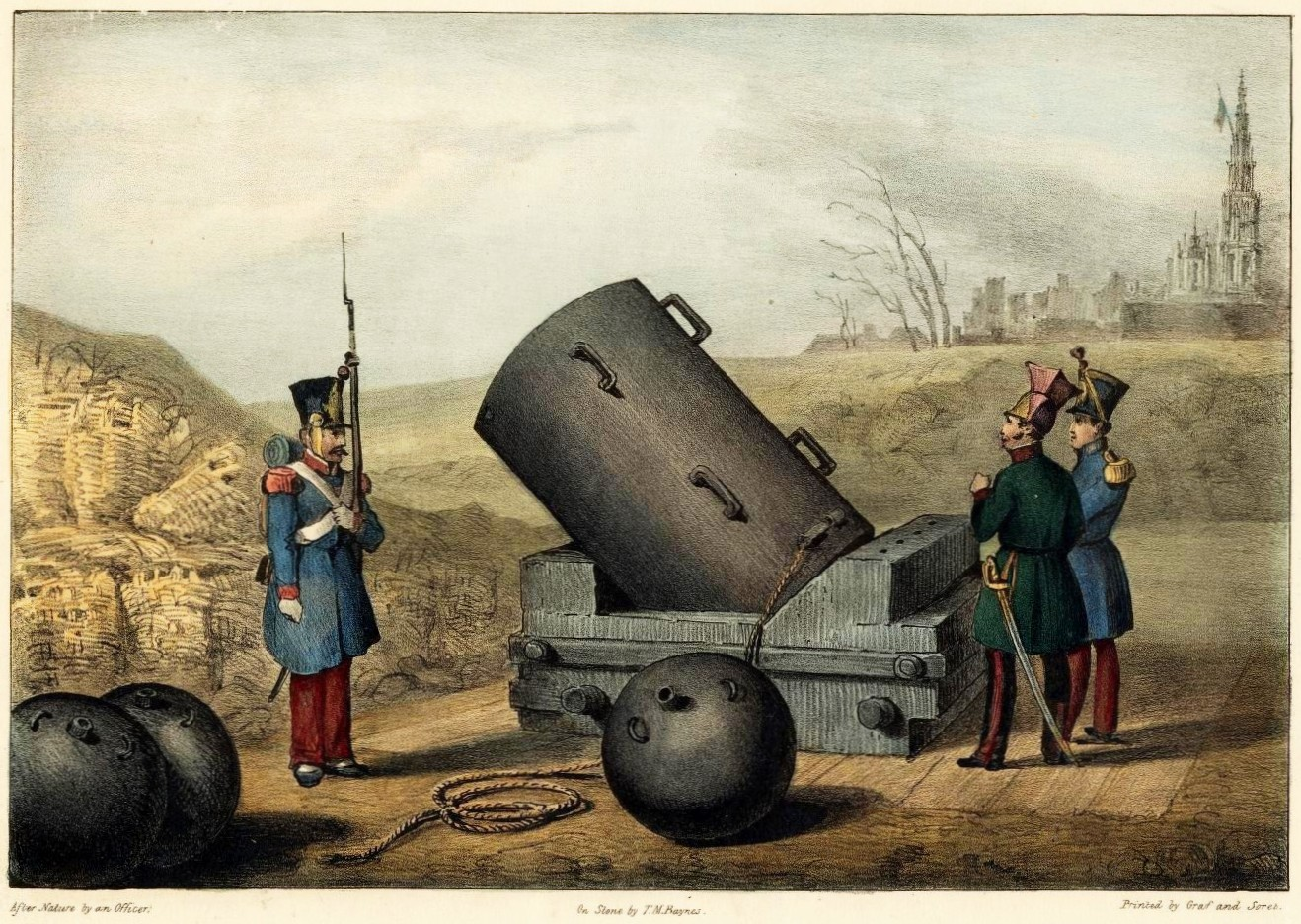
- Monster mortar employed during the siege of Antwerp Citadel in 1832
- Type: Heavy mortar
- Place of origin: Belgium

Service history
- In service: 1832
- Used by: Belgium
- Wars: Siege of Antwerp (1832)

Production history
- Designer: Henri-Joseph Paixhans
- Designed: 1832
- Manufacturer: Royal cannon foundry of Liège
- No. built: 2

Specifications
- Mass: 7,750 kg (17,090 lb) (without carriage)
- Shell: 500 kg (1,100 lb) bomb
- Caliber: 24 inches (610 mm)
- Barrels: 1
- Feed system: Muzzle loading
- Filling: powder
- Filling weight: Max. 14 kg (31 lb)

The Monster Mortar (French: Mortier Monstre) was one of the largest mortars ever developed. Also called Leopold or the Liège mortar, the 24 inches (610 mm) caliber mortar was conceived by the French artillery officer Henri-Joseph Paixhans. The mortar was manufactured under the direction of the Belgian Minister of War Baron Louis Evain and cast at the Royal Canon Foundry (Fonderie royale de canons) in Liège, Belgium in 1832. It saw action at the Battle of Antwerp in December 1832.

== Caliber ==
The Monster Mortar was ordered by the Belgian Minister of War Baron Evain. Conceived by the French artillery officer Henri-Joseph Paixhans, the 24 inches (610 mm) caliber mortar was cast at the Belgian royal foundry of Cannons in 1832 in Liège, Belgium.

French contemporary sources report that the Monster Mortar had a caliber of 22 in (560 mm). Before the adoption of the metric system, several European countries had customary units whose name translates into "inch". The French pouce measured 27.88 mm (1.098 in), at least when applied to describe the calibre of artillery pieces (see also: Units of measurement in France and Mesures usuelles). 22 French inches are equivalent to 24 English inches. Thus the caliber was about 610 mm (24 in).

In some sources it is stated that the Monster Mortar had a caliber of 36 French inches or 975 mm (38.4 in). This is apparently false, with the true caliber being 610 mm. The misunderstanding might stem from the fact that the outer diameter of the barrel was 1 m (39 in), also about 975 mm or 36 French inches. Thus it might be that on some sources, the outer barrel diameter of 36 French inches has been mixed with the caliber of 22 French inches (naturally "caliber" means the internal diameter of the barrel aperture).

Next to the Monster Mortar, the largest mortars ever developed were two 36 inches (914 mm) caliber mortars: Mallet's Mortar, designed by Robert Mallet and tested by the Woolwich Arsenal, London, in 1857; and "Little David" developed in the United States for use in World War II. These mortars never saw action.

== Service ==
=== Belgian revolution ===
The Belgian Revolution that began in August 1830 led to the secession of the southern provinces from the United Kingdom of the Netherlands and established an independent Kingdom of Belgium. The Dutch king William I intended to suppress the Belgian Revolution by invading Belgium on 2 August 1831. Over the course of the next few days Belgian forces were defeated several times in battle and Dutch troops advanced deep into Belgian territory until, on 8 August, the Belgian government appealed to France for support. Following the Ten Days' Campaign of the French Armée du Nord under Marshal Étienne Gérard, the Dutch troops started to withdraw. The King of the Netherlands ordered the Dutch General David Hendrik Chassé to hold the Citadel of Antwerp at all costs with 4500 men.

=== Siege of Antwerp ===
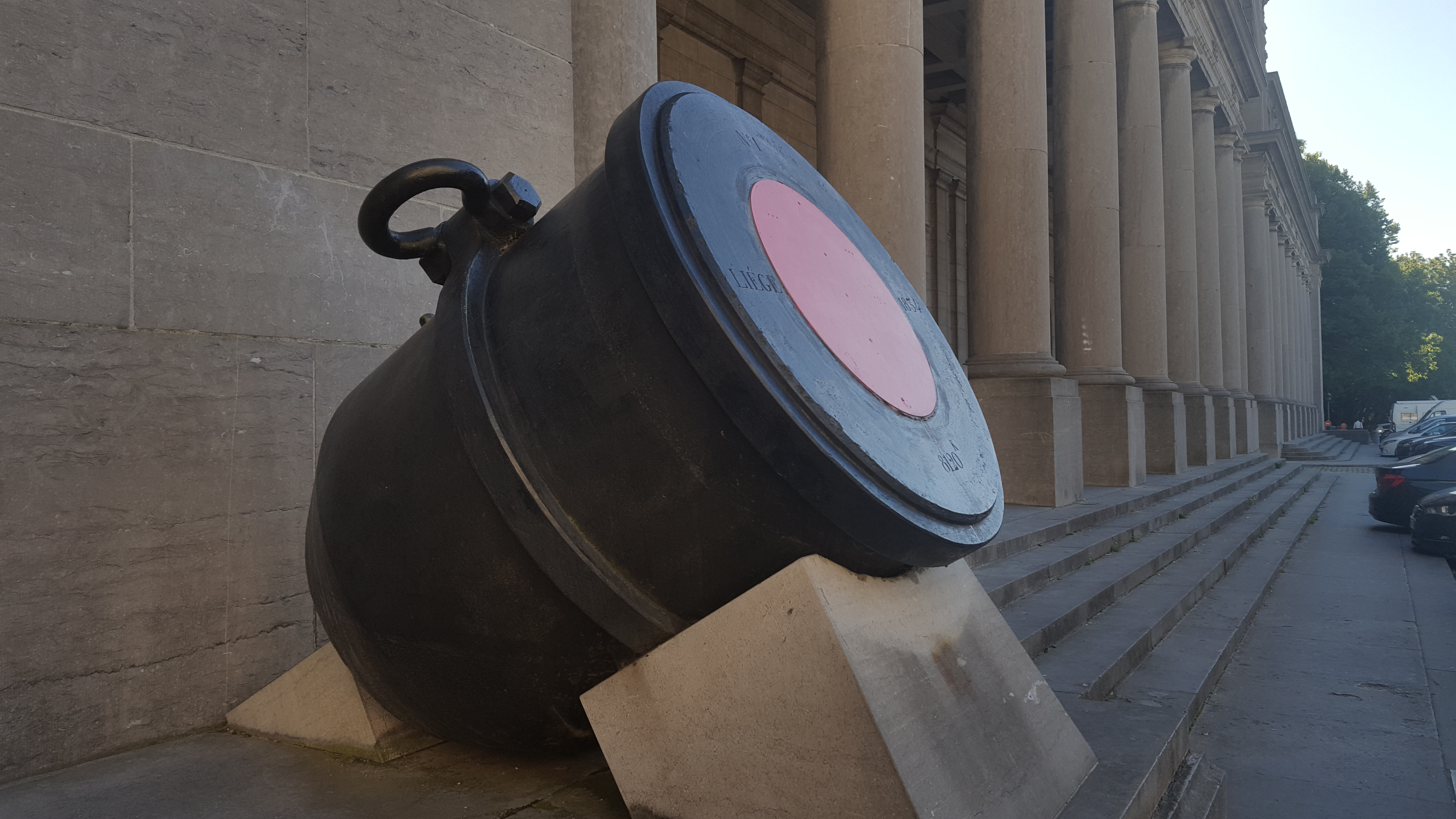
The second "monster mortar", built in Liège in 1834, currently displayed outside the Royal Museum of the Armed Forces and Military History, Brussels

From the citadel, Chassé bombarded the city of Antwerp, setting fire to hundreds of homes and causing many casualties among the civilian population. These events led to the second intervention by the French. On 15 November 1832, the French Armée du Nord and its siege specialist François Haxo began to lay the Dutch troops under siege, quickly occupying Fort Montebello situated to the east of the citadel and to the south of the city from which they started firing at the citadel.

The "Monster Mortar" saw action on 21 December and 22 December 1832 but was abandoned in Fort Montebello soon after. The "Monster Mortar" fired about 15 rounds during 21 and 22 December. The mortar used during the Siege of Antwerp exploded during a test firing on 18 May 1833 in Brasschaat, near Antwerp. This mortar was apparently later repaired as a photograph of it in display in a museum in Brussels exists. A second monster mortar was manufactured in Liège in 1834. It is currently (2024) sitting outside Royal Museum of the Armed Forces and Military History.

== See also ==
- List of heavy mortars
- List of the largest cannon by caliber
