= Eprouvette =

An eprouvette is a one piece, fixed elevation mortar used by ordnance departments and armories to test the strength of gunpowder.

A carefully weighed quantity of powder (charge) was placed inside the device, followed by a standard weight shot. The charge was fired and the distance the shot flew was measured and compared to the expected standard distance. Eprouvettes were first introduced in the middle of the 1600s and went out of general use by the middle of the 19th century.

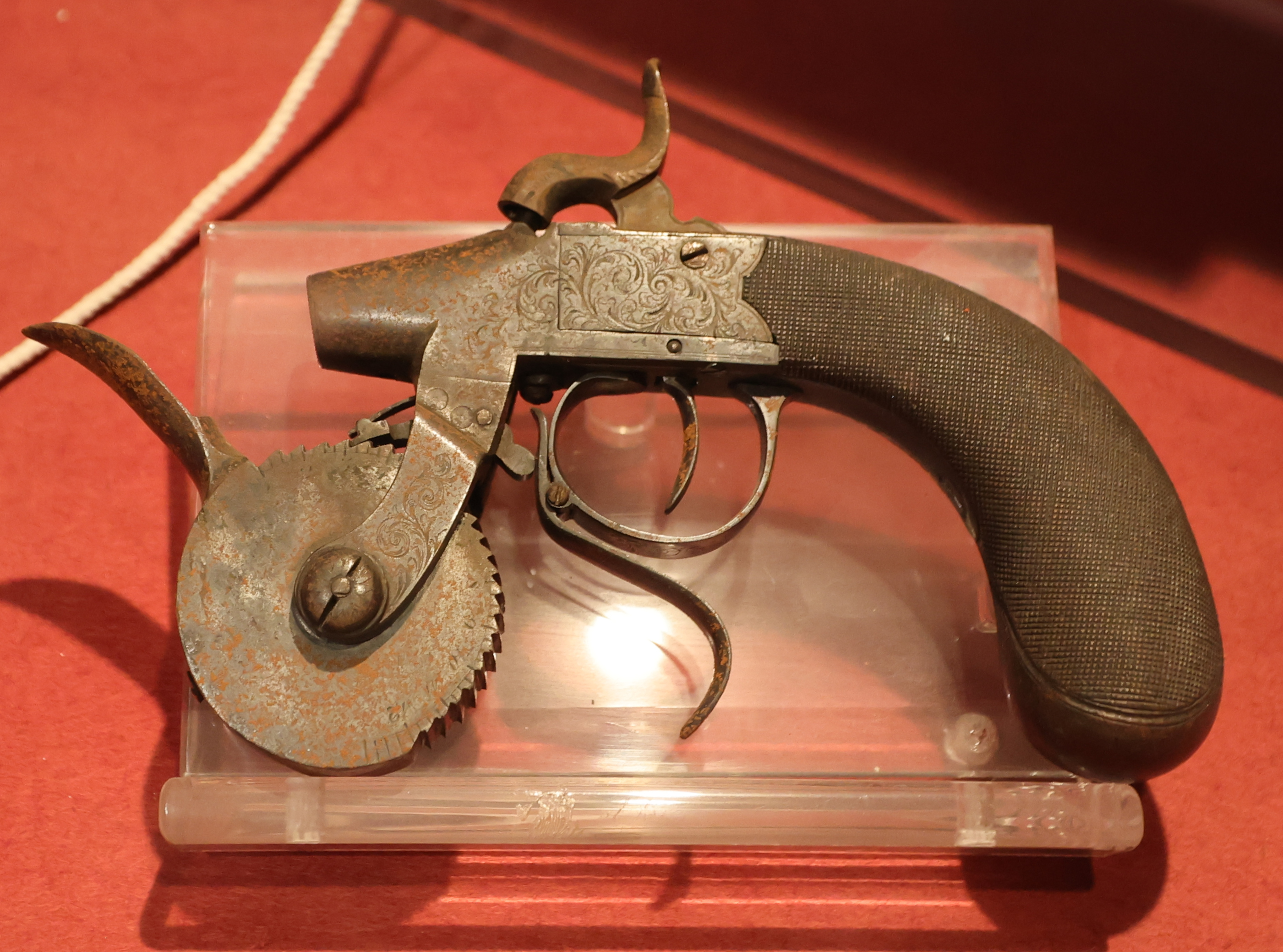
An Eprouvette pistol. The picture shows an Eprouvette that does not use shot distance. When discharged the pressure wave moves the wheel round. The wheel is graduated to inform the powder strength.

Eprouvettes were also used to test the strength of small-arms powder, starting in the second half of the 1500s. These evolved into pistol-size devices which were used until the end of the black powder era, at the close of the 1800s.
