= Henri-Joseph Paixhans =

French artillery officer and inventor

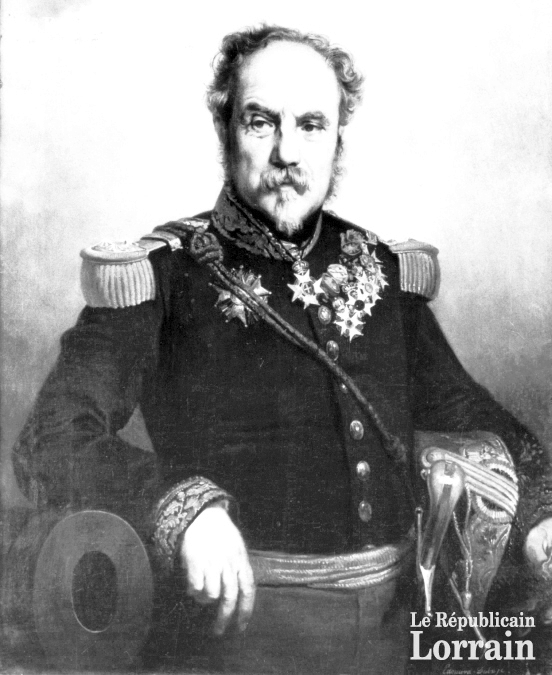
- Born: January 22, 1783; Metz, Kingdom of France
- Died: August 22, 1854 (aged 71) Jouy-aux-Arches, French Empire
- Allegiance: First French Empire; Bourbon Restoration; July Monarchy
- Branch: French Imperial Army; French Royal Army
- Rank: Lieutenant-General
- Conflicts: Napoleonic Wars
- Awards: Legion of Honour (Grand Officier)
- Education: École Polytechnique

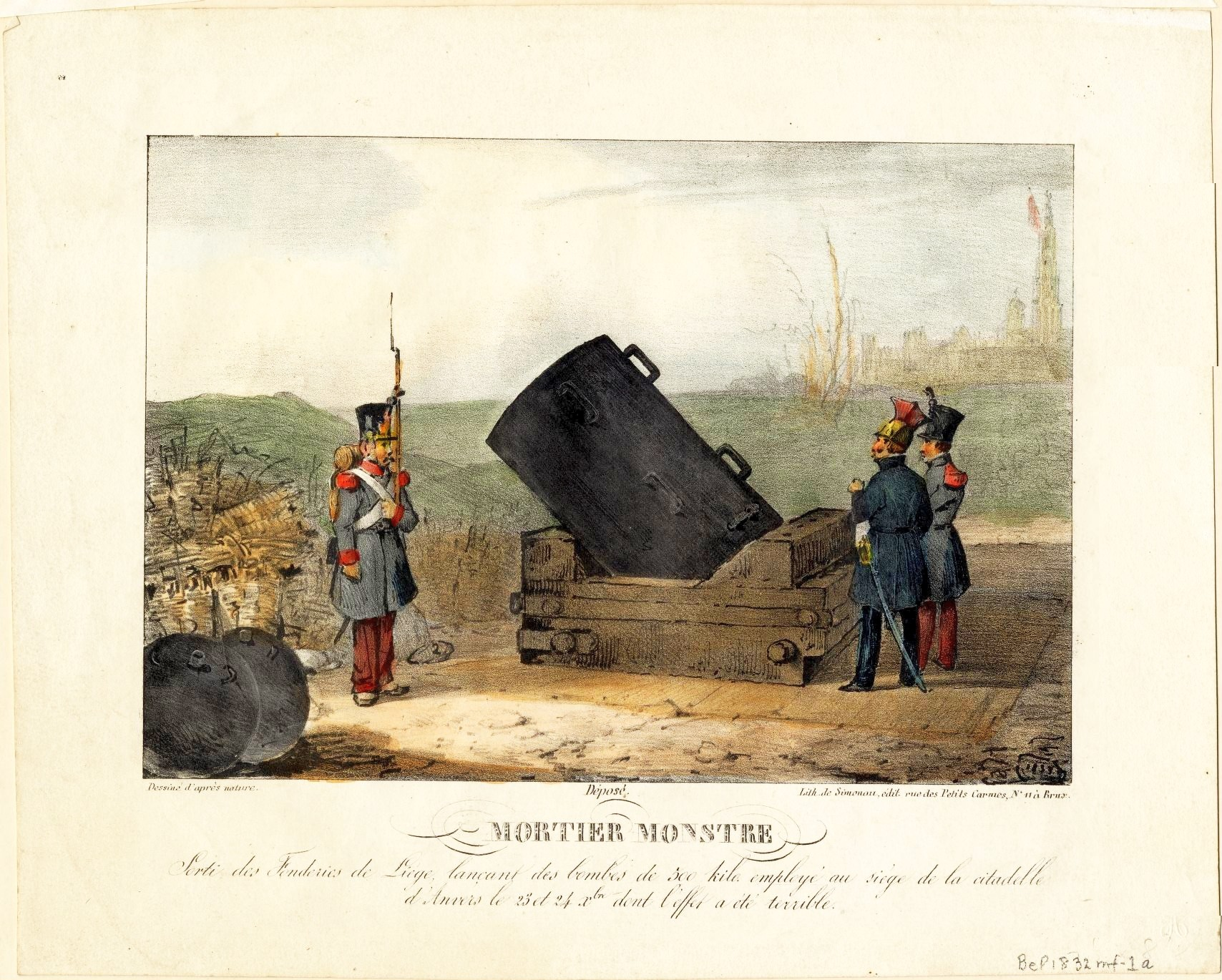
The Mortier monstre, invented by Henri-Joseph Paixhans.

Henri-Joseph Paixhans (French pronunciation: [pɛksɑ̃]; January 22, 1783, Metz – August 22, 1854, Jouy-aux-Arches) was a French artillery officer of the beginning of the 19th century.

Henri-Joseph Paixhans graduated from the École Polytechnique. He fought in the Napoleonic Wars, was the representative (Député) for the Moselle department between 1830 and 1848, and became "General de Division" in 1848.

In 1823, he invented the first shell guns, which came to be called Paixhans guns (or "canon-obusiers" in the French Navy). Paixhans guns became the first naval guns to combine explosive shells and a flat trajectory, thereby triggering the demise of wooden ships, and the iron hull revolution in shipbuilding. Paixhans also invented a "Mortier monstre" ("Monster Mortar"), using 500 kg bombs, which was used to terrible effect in the Siege of Antwerp in 1832. He was also a naval theorist claiming that a few aggressively armed small units could destroy the largest naval units of the time, making him a precursor of the French "Jeune École" school of thought.

The poet Victor Hugo wrote:

"Terre! l'obus est Dieu, Paixhans est son prophète."
("Earth! the shell is God, Paixhans is his Prophet.")

== Paixhans naval guns ==
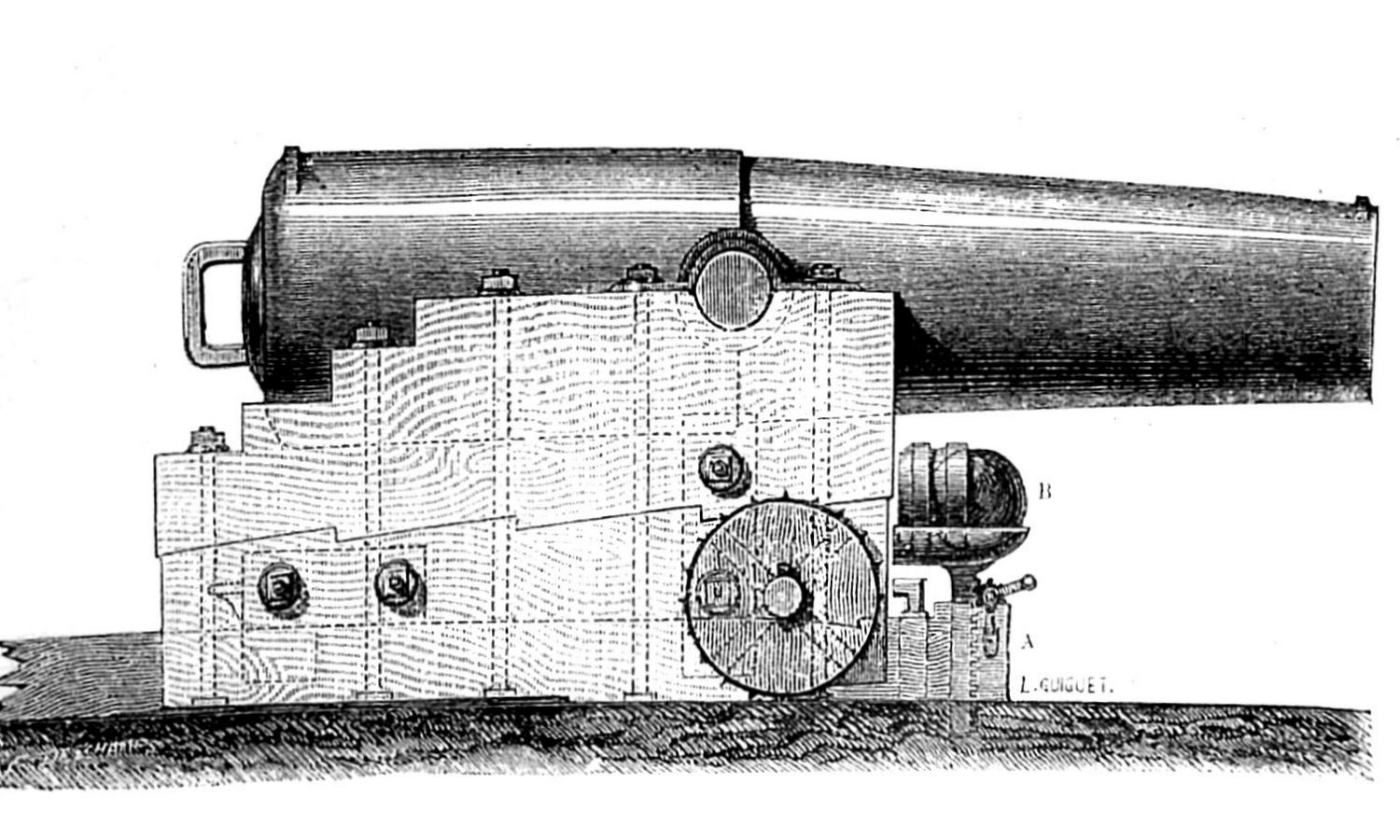
A Paixhans gun.

Paixhans developed a delaying mechanism which, for the first time, allowed shells to be fired safely in high-powered flat-trajectory guns. The effect of explosive shells hitting wooden hulls and setting them aflame was devastating, and was demonstrated in trials against the two-decker Pacificateur in 1824.

The first Paixhans guns were founded in 1841. The barrel of the guns weighed about 10,000 pounds, and proved accurate to about two miles. In the 1840s, France, England, Russia and the United States had adopted the new naval guns.

The effect of the guns in an operational context was first demonstrated during the actions at Eckernförde in 1849 during the First Schleswig war, and especially at the Battle of Sinop in 1853 during the Crimean War.

== Legacy ==
=== Ironclad warships ===
Wooden boats became so vulnerable that the only possible response could come with the introduction of the iron-hulled warship. The first of them was the French La Gloire, which was a wooden ship with iron sheathing. She was soon followed by HMS Warrior, which was iron-hulled with wooden backing.

=== Further developments ===
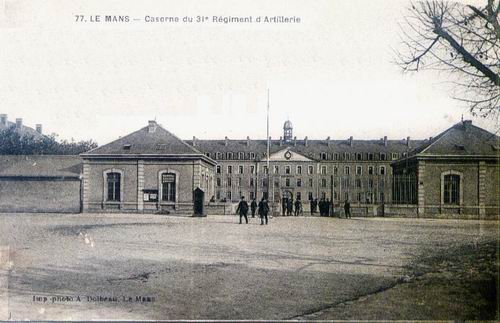
The "Paixhans" barracks in Le Mans, France.

Paixhans's design was later improved by the American John A. Dahlgren, who wrote:

"Paixhans had so far satisfied naval men of the power of shell guns as to obtain their admission on shipboard; but by unduly developing the explosive element, he had sacrificed accuracy and range.... The difference between the system of Paixhans and my own was simply that Paixhans guns were strictly shell guns, and were not designed for shot, nor for great penetration or accuracy at long ranges. They were, therefore, auxiliary to, or associates of, the shot-guns. This made a mixed armament, was objectionable as such, and never was adopted to any extent in France... My idea was, to have a gun that should generally throw shells far and accurately, with the capacity to fire solid shot when needed. Also to compose the whole battery entirely of such guns."

— Admiral John A. Dahlgren.

=== Floating batteries ===
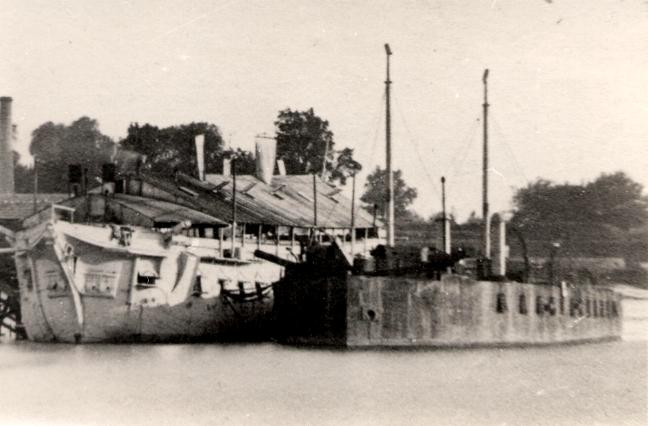
The floating battery Paixhans (1862).

A class of floating batteries named after Paixhans was developed by Henri Dupuy de Lôme. Four of these ships were launched between 1861 and 1862. Originally designed for use in Cochinchina, they were built in wood and equipped with 4 ft batteries.

== Writings ==
Paixhans wrote, among others:

- Considérations sur l'état actuel de l'artillerie des places (1815)
- Nouvelle force maritime (Paris 1822), OL 17092419W in which he envisioned a fleet protected by armour and equipped with explosive shells.
- Force et faiblesse militaires de la France (1830)
- Constitution militaire de la France (Paris 1849) OL 10308202W
- Retraite de Moscou (Metz 1868) OL 10308203W
