= GMM 120 =

GMM 120 / Morty / Patzmi
- Type: GPS-guided and/or laser-guided mortar shell
- Place of origin: Israel

Service history
- Used by: Israel

Production history
- Manufacturer: Israel Military Industries

Specifications
- Diameter: 120 mm
- Caliber: 120 mm
- Effective firing range: 8 kilometres (5.0 mi)
- Guidance system: GPS / Laser-guided

GMM 120 (Guided Mortar Munition 120; known as Patzmi; also referred to as Morty) is a GPS and/or laser-guided mortar munition, which was developed by Israel Military Industries.
