= List of crew-served weapons of the U.S. Armed Forces =

This list contains weapons that are classified as crew-served, as the term is used in the United States military.

While the general understanding is that crew-served weapons require more than one person to operate them, there are important exceptions in the case of both squad automatic weapons (SAW) and sniper rifles. Within the table of organization and equipment for both the United States Army and the U.S. Marine Corps, these two classes of weapons are understood to be crew-served, as the operator of the weapon has an assistant, who carries additional ammunition and associated equipment, acts as a spotter, and is also fully qualified in the operation of the weapon.

== Light and medium machine guns ==
=== In active service ===
==== General purpose machine guns ====
- M240B/M240E4 (7.62×51mm NATO)
- M240G (7.62×51mm NATO) (USMC)
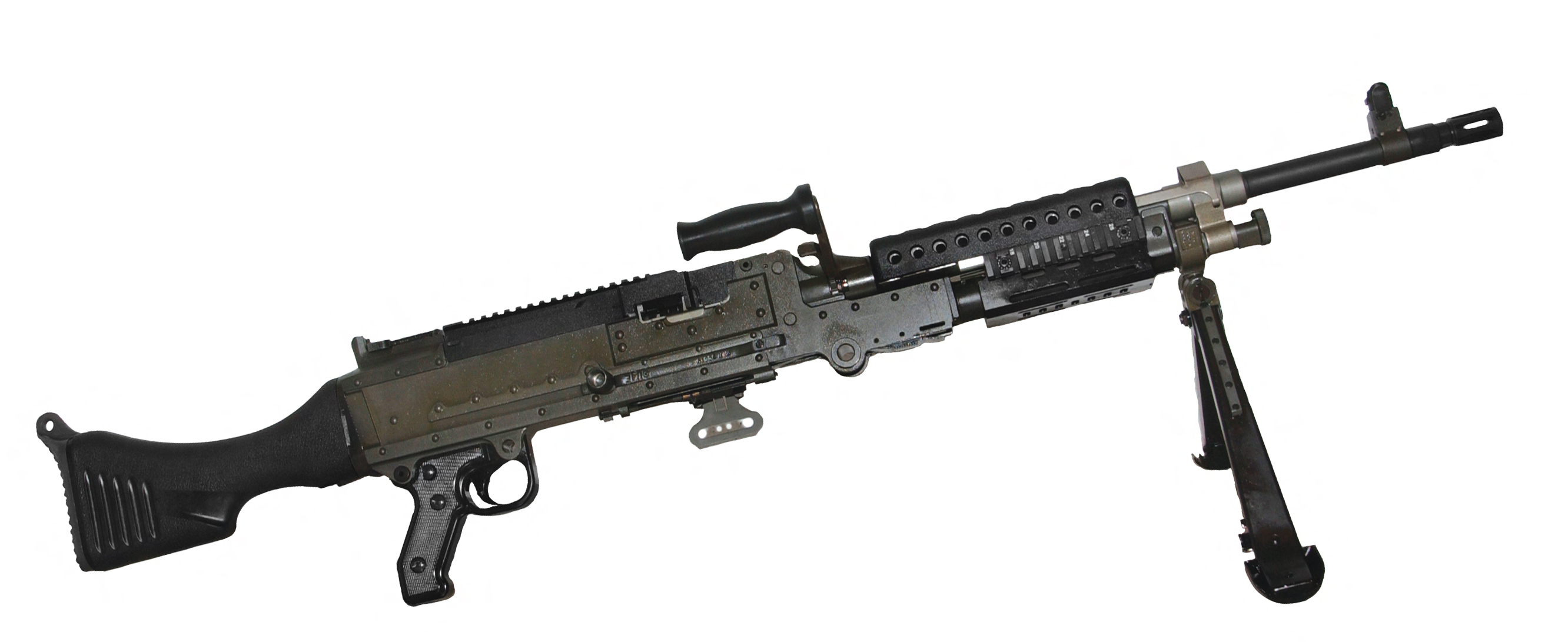
M240B

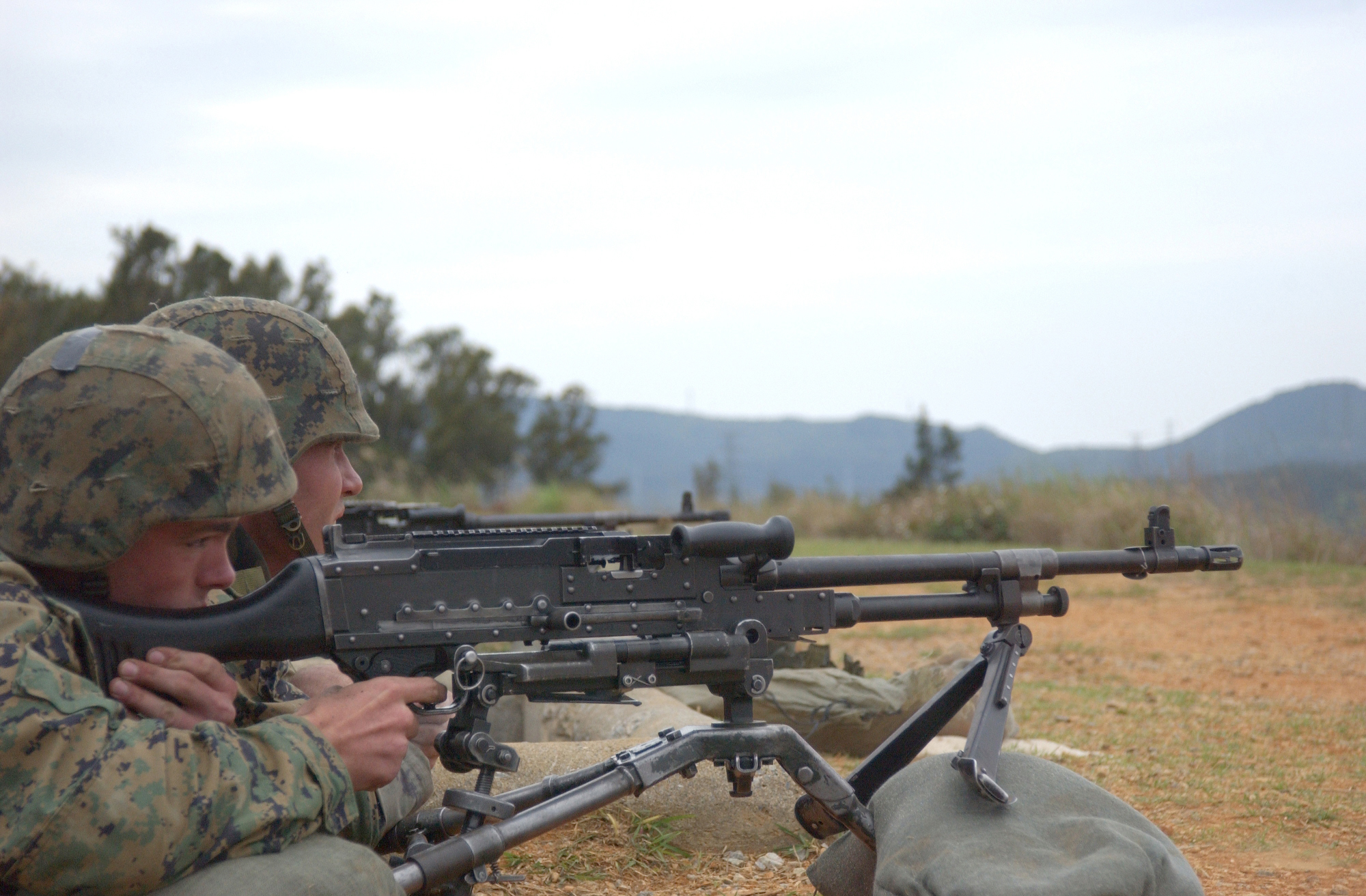
Marines with a tripod-mounted M240G

=== In active service (some branches, secondary or limited roles) ===
==== General purpose machine guns ====
- M240D/M240E1 and M240H/M240E5 (Vehicle Mountable) (7.62×51mm NATO)
- M240L/M240E6 (7.62×51mm NATO) (US Army)
- M60D (Vehicle Mountable) (7.62×51mm NATO) (USN)
- M60E3 (7.62×51mm NATO) (USN SEALs)
- M60E4/Mk 43 Mod 0/1 (7.62×51mm NATO) (USN)
- Mk 48 Mod 0/1 (7.62×51mm NATO) (USSOCOM)
- MG 338 (.338 Norma Magnum) (USSOCOM)
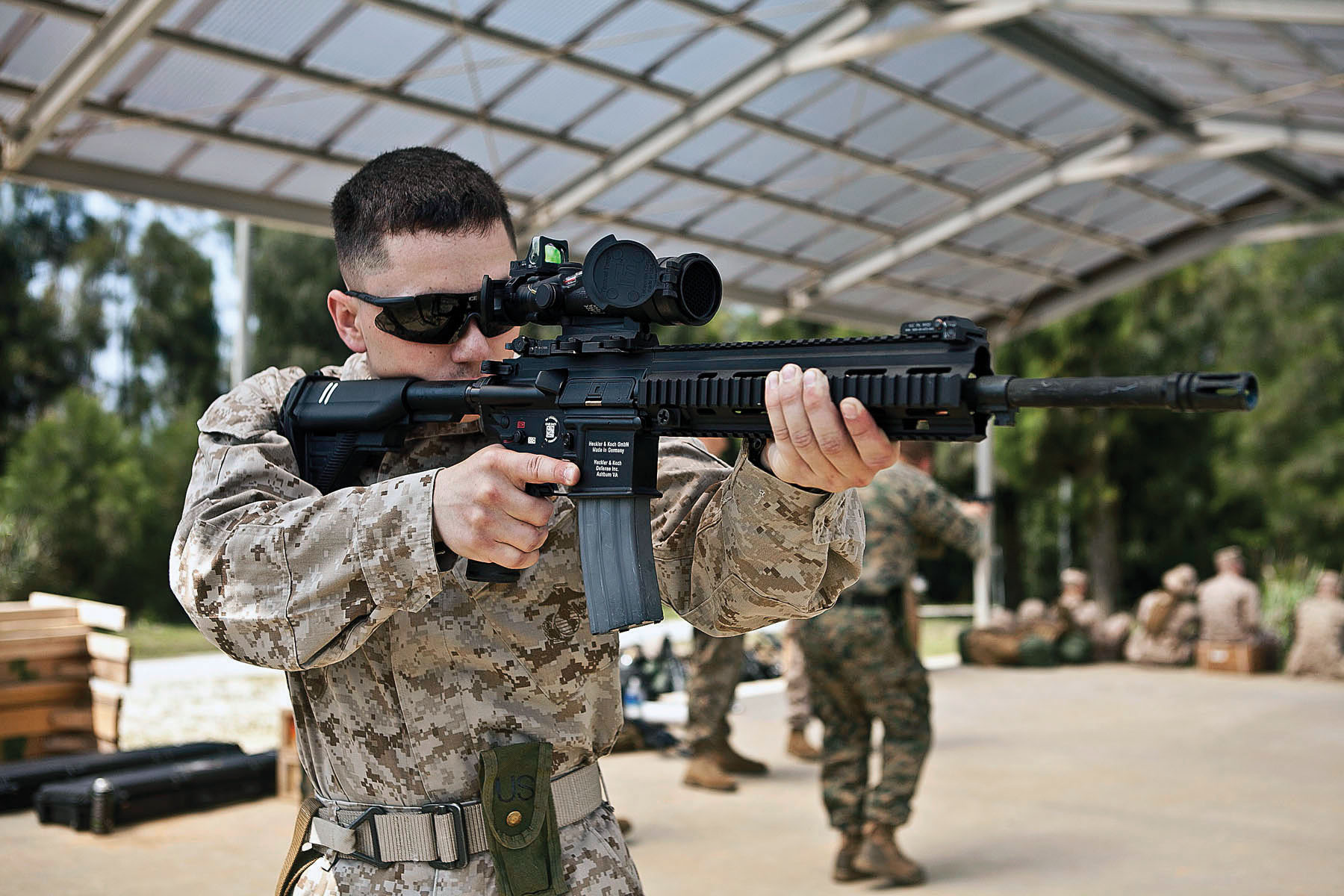
M27 IAR (Infantry Automatic Rifle)

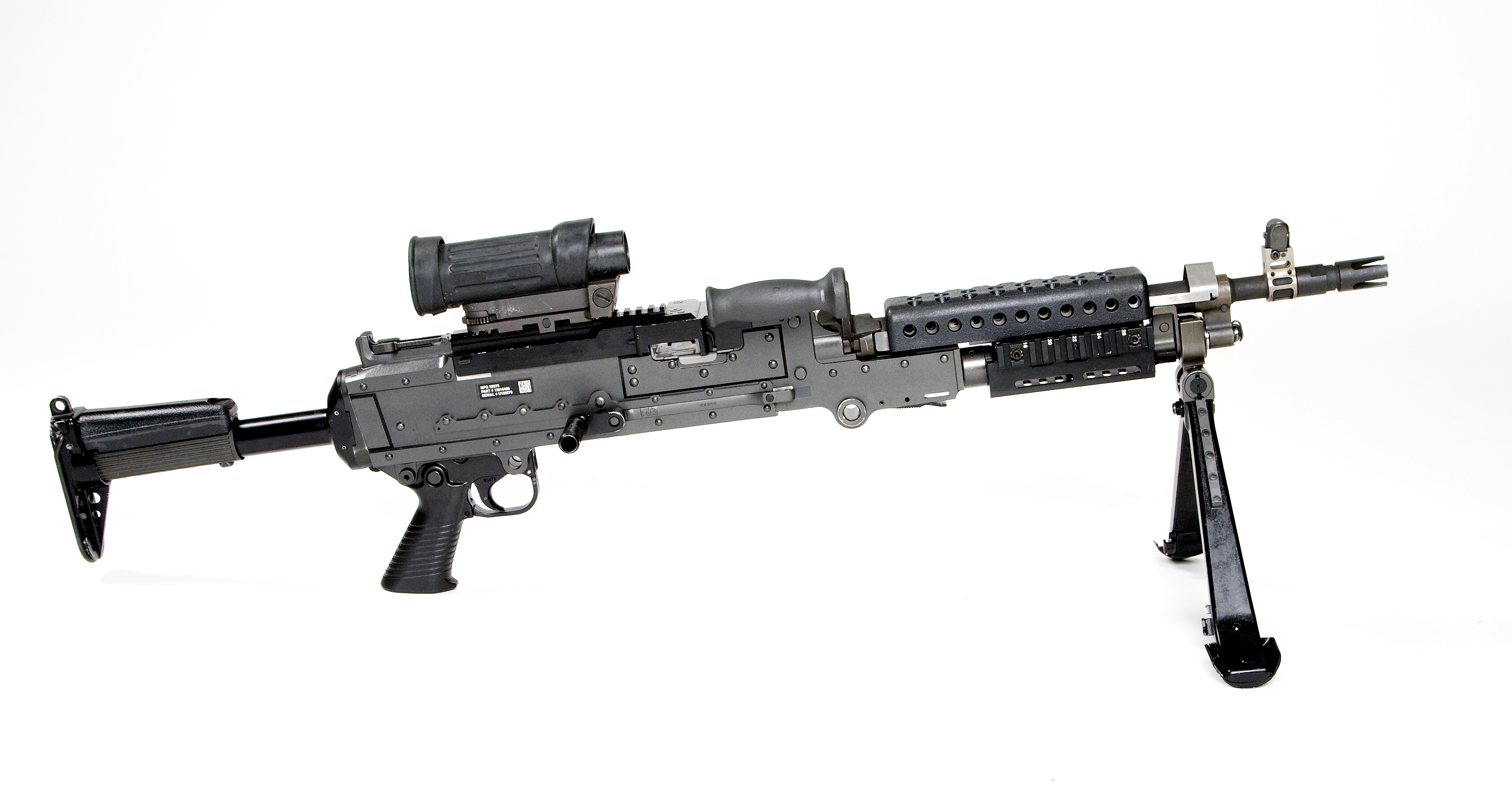
M240L/M240E6

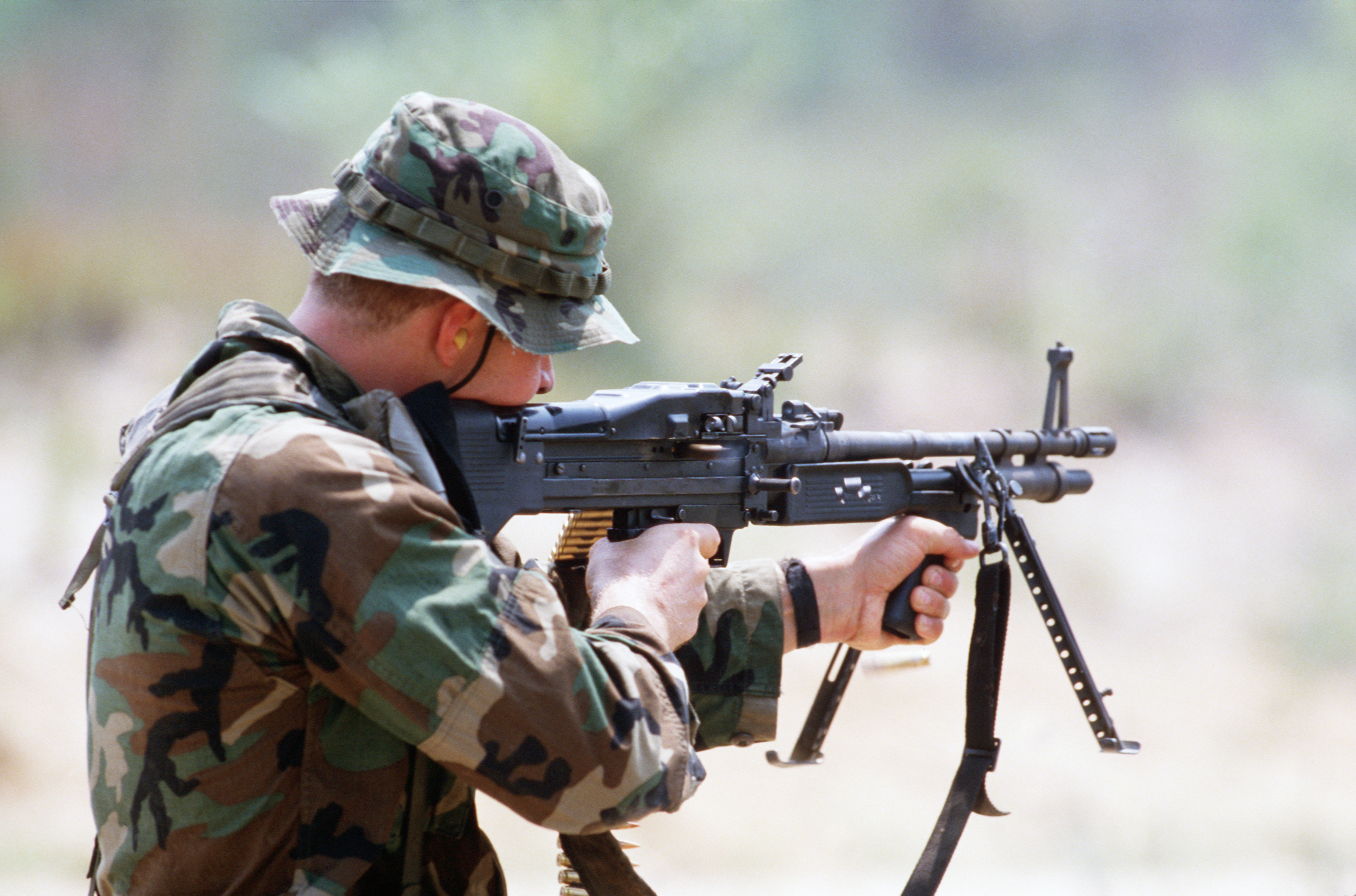
Navy SEAL fires an M60E3 from the shoulder

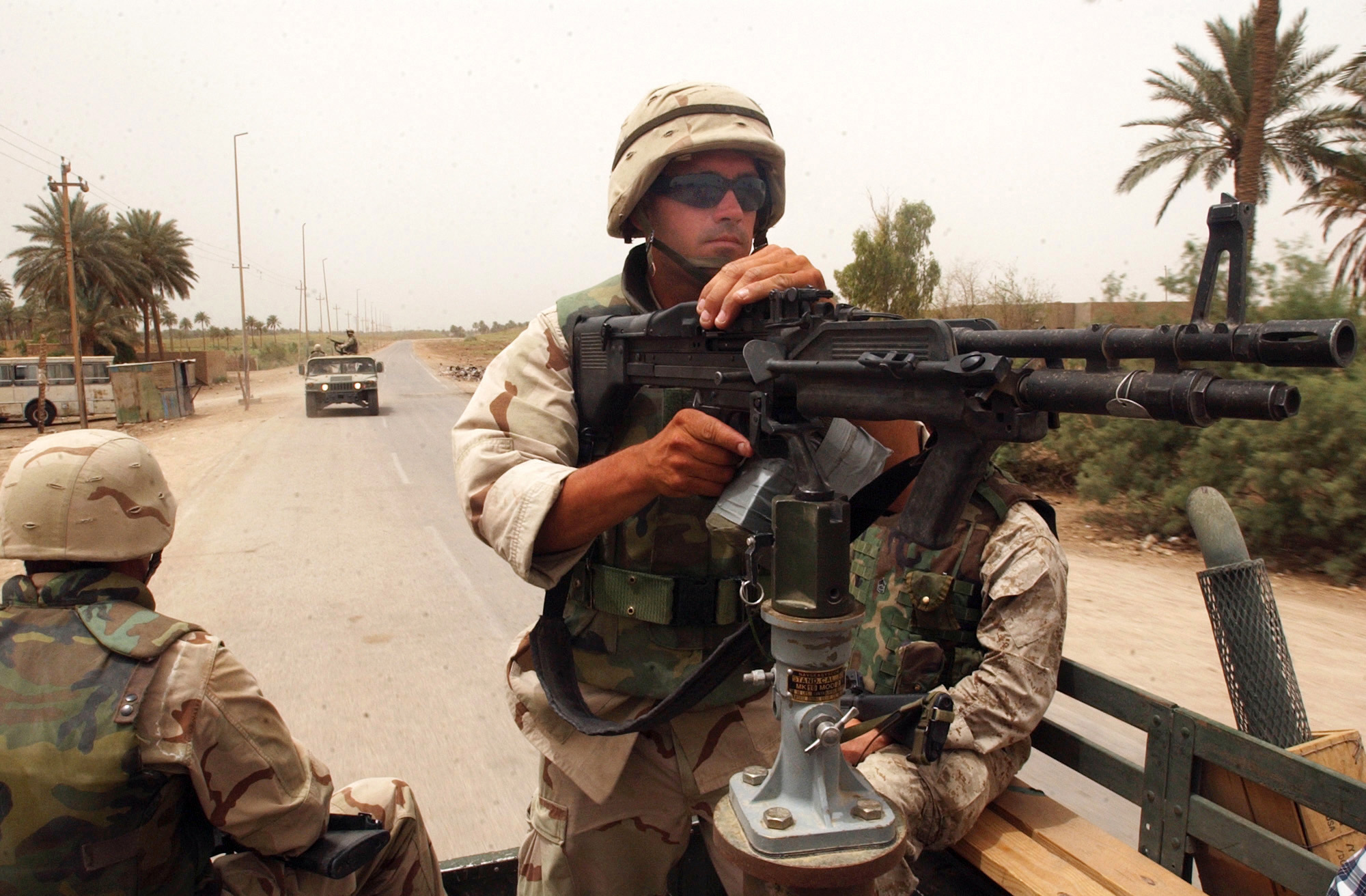
M60E4/Mk 43 Mod 0/1

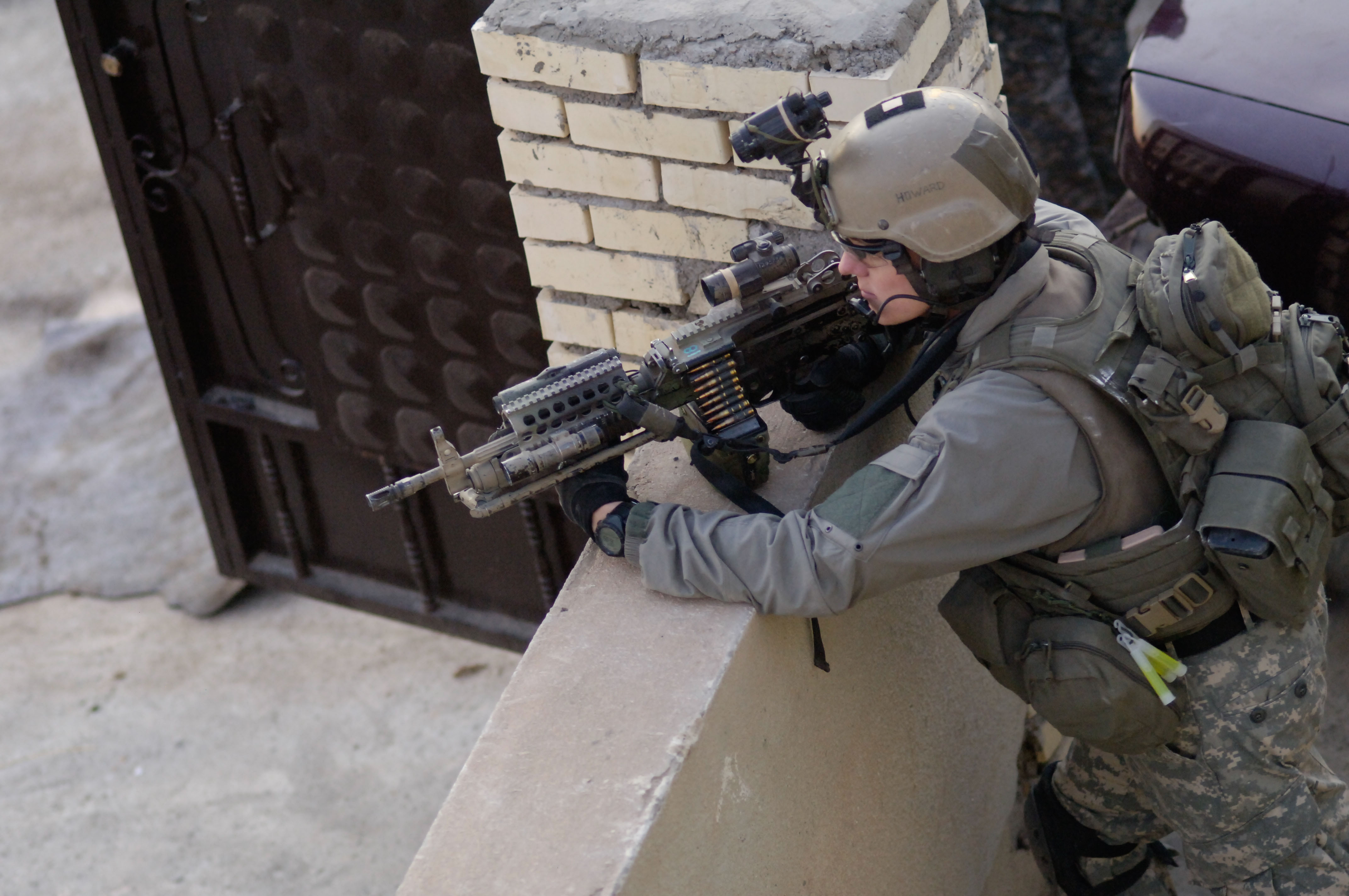
U.S. Army Ranger equipped with a Mk 46 Mod 1

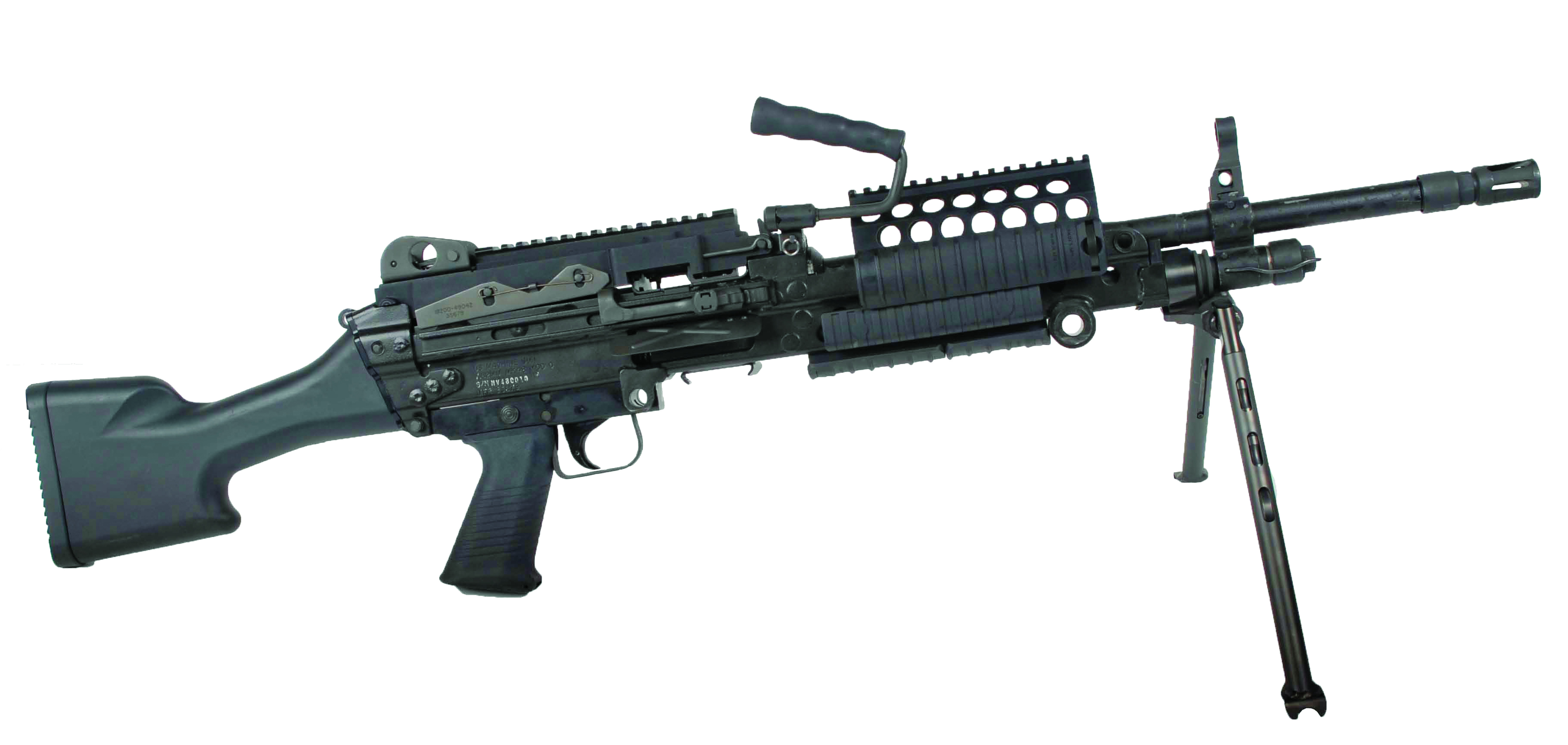
Mk 48

=== Out of service ===
- HK21 (7.62×51mm NATO, Delta Force, Combat Controllers(CCT) and SEALs only)
- XM8 LMG (5.56×45mm NATO)
- EX 27 Mod 0 (Colt CMG-2; 5.56×45mm)
- WAK 'Interim SAW (5.56×45mm)
- XM106 (5.56×45mm)
- XM262 (HK 21E variant, pre-HK 23E; 5.56×45mm)
- XM234 (6×45mm, 5.56×45mm)
- XM233 (6×45mm)
- XM235/XM248 (6×45mm, 5.56×45mm)
- XM223
- CAR-15 HBAR (M1 and M2, 5.56×45mm)
- T161 (7.62×51mm NATO)
- T52 (7.62×51mm NATO)
- T44 (.30-06)
- T24 (.30-06)
- T10/T23 (.30-06)
- M1918A1/A2 BAR (.30-06)
- M1922 BAR (.30-06)
- Johnson M1941 LMG (.30-06, Rangers and Special Operations Forces only)
- M14A1 (7.62×51mm NATO)
- M15 (7.62×51mm NATO)
- M16A1 with bipod (5.56×45mm NATO)
- XM207/E1/Mk 23 Mod 0 (Stoner 63A1 'Commando'; 5.56×45mm NATO)
- M1919A6 (.30-06)
- Lewis Gun (.30-06, Army only)
- Chauchat (.30-06, 8 mm Lebel)
- M1909 Benét–Mercié (Machine Rifle, (.30-06))

=== Experimental ===
- Mk48 Mod 2
- AAI Corporation LSAT (Lightweight Small Arms Technologies) LMG (5.56 mm Composite-cased, Telescoping Ammunition)
- Knight's Armament Company LAMG
- FN EVOLYS
- Sig Sauer MG 6.8 (SiG 6.8 mm Fury hybrid round)
- General Dynamics RM277 (True Velocity .277 TVCM polimer cased round)
- Next Generation Squad Weapon - Automatic Rifle
- Lightweight Medium Machine Gun (Medium Machine Gun) (.338 Norma Magnum)
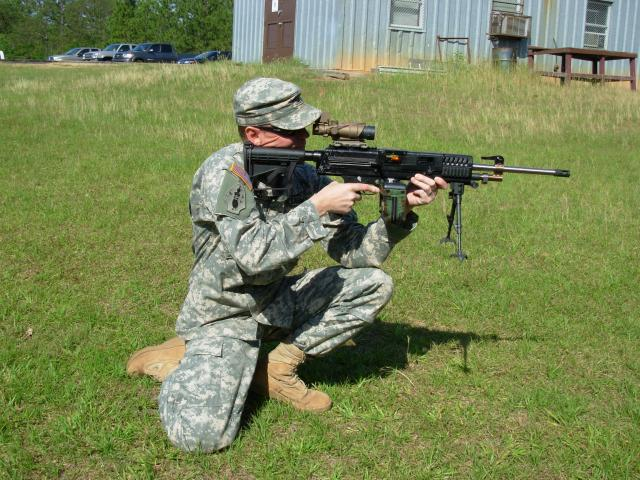
LSAT LMG

== Sniper and anti-materiel rifles ==
=== In active service (some branches, secondary or limited roles) ===
==== Bolt action sniper rifle ====
- M40A3/A5 (7.62×51mm NATO) (USMC)
- M2010 ESR (Enhanced Sniper Rifle) (.300 Winchester Magnum) (US Army)
- Mk 13 Mod 5 AWM (Arctic Warfare Magnum) (.300 Winchester Magnum)
- Mk 21 Mod 0 PSR (Precision Sniper Rifle) (USSOCOM)
- Mk 22 ASR (Advanced Sniper Rifle) (USSOCOM)

==== Semi-automatic sniper rifle ====
- Mk 11 Mod 0/1/2 SWS (Sniper Weapon System) (7.62×51mm NATO)
- M110 SASS (Semi-Automatic Sniper System) (7.62×51mm NATO)
- Mk 14 Mod 0/1 EBR (Enhanced Battle Rifle) (7.62×51mm NATO) (USN SEALs, US Army and USCG)
- M110A1 CSASS (Compact Semi-Automatic Sniper System) (7.62×51 NATO, 6.5 Creedmoore) (US Army, USMC)
- M110K1 SASS (7.62×51 NATO, 6.5 Creedmoore) (US Navy Designated Marksman)
- Mk 20 Mod 0 SSR (Sniper Support Rifle) (7.62×51mm NATO, 6.5 Creedmoor) (USSOCOM)
- M14 Tactical Rifle (7.62×51mm NATO) (USCG)

==== Anti-materiel rifle ====
- M82A1M/A3 (Anti-Materiel rifle) (.50 BMG)
- M107 (Anti-Materiel rifle) (.50 BMG)
- Mk 15 Mod 0 LRSW (Long-Range Sniper Weapon) (Bolt Action Anti-Materiel Rifle) (.50 BMG) (USN SEALs)
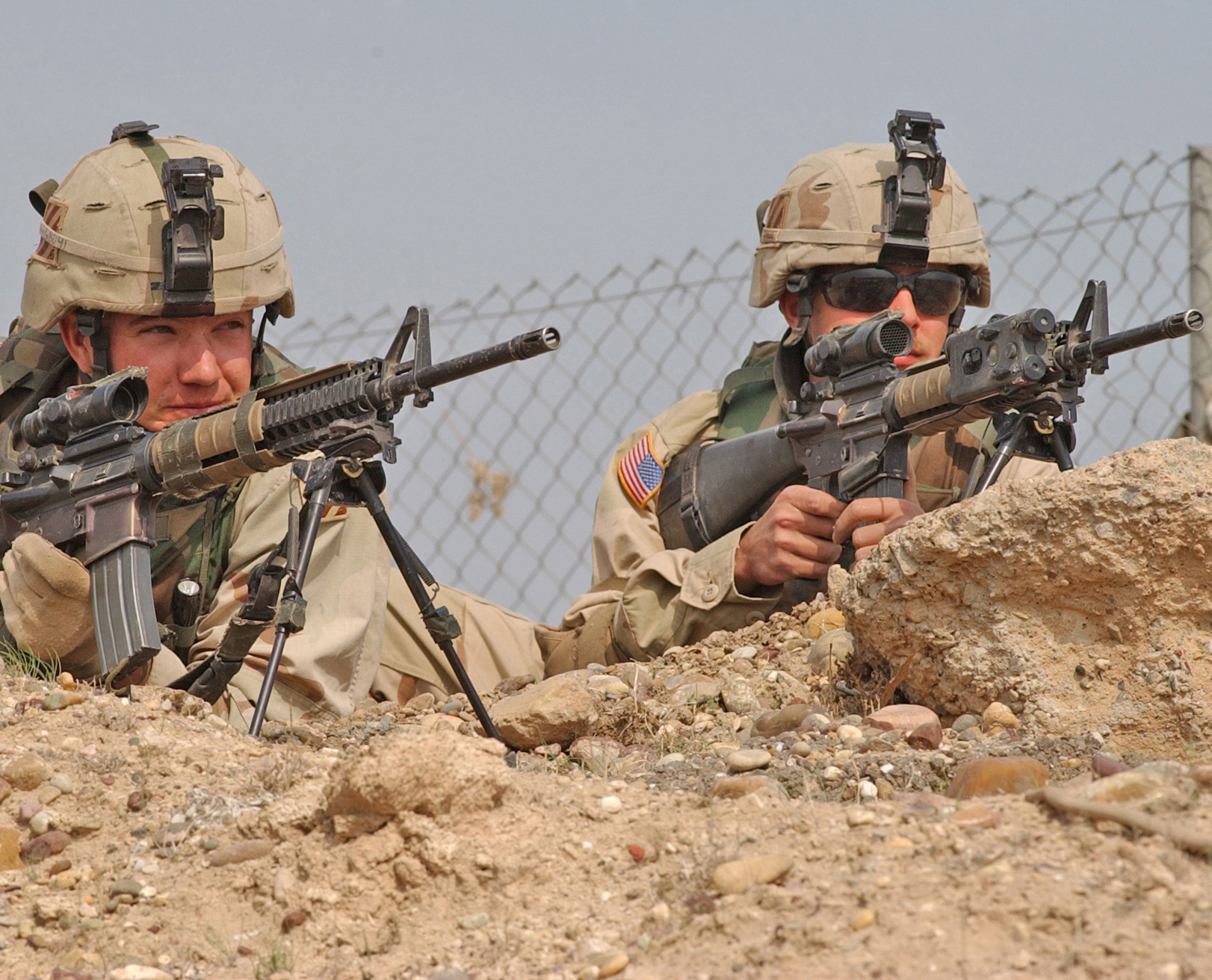
Soldiers with SDMRs

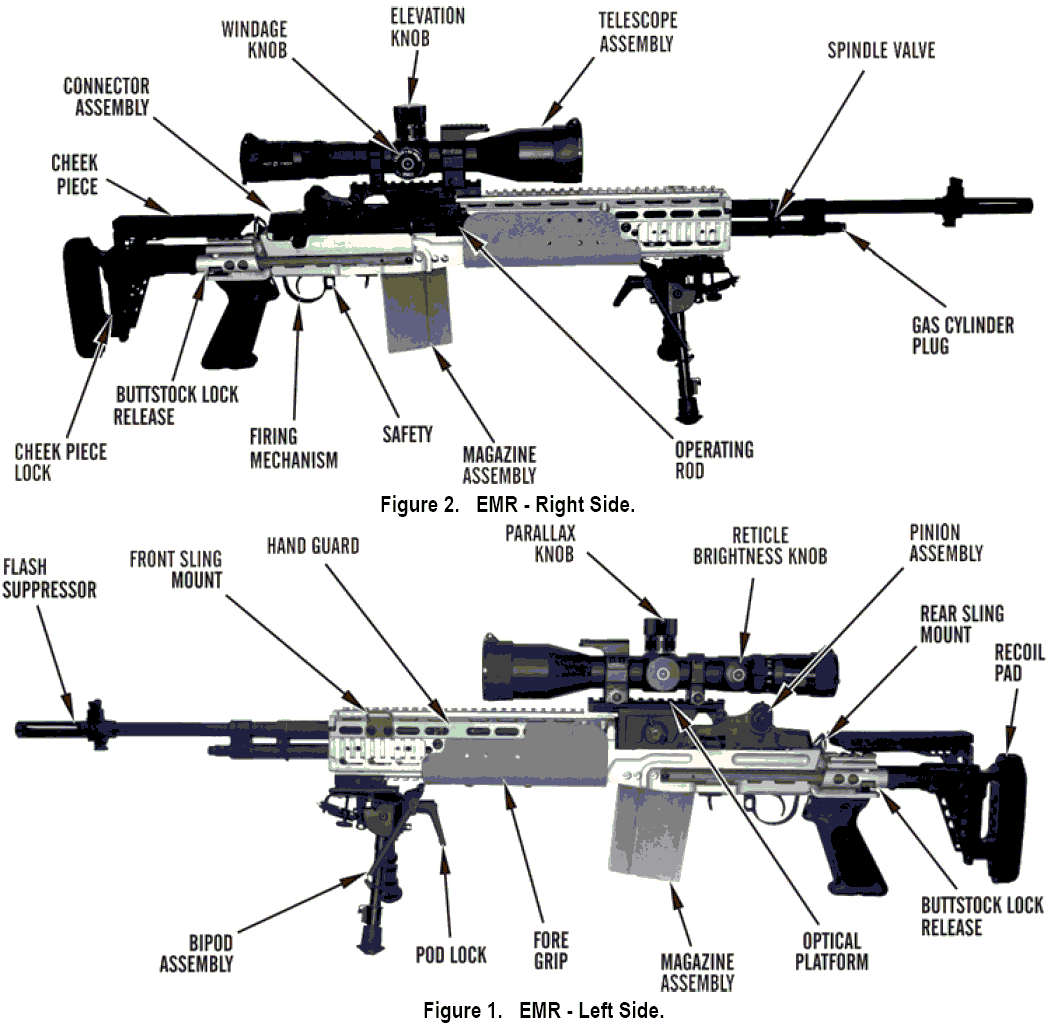
M39 EMR (Enhanced Marksman Rifle)

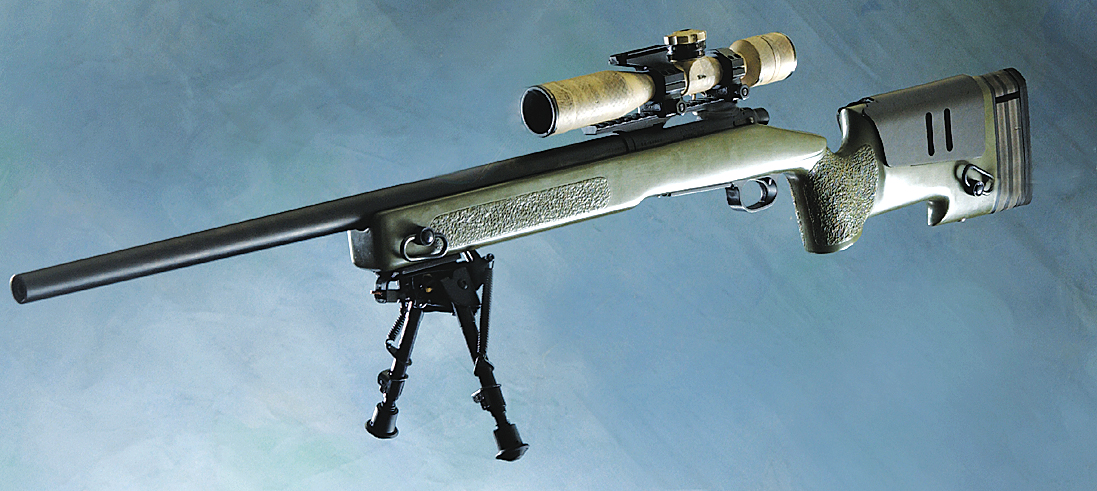
M40A3

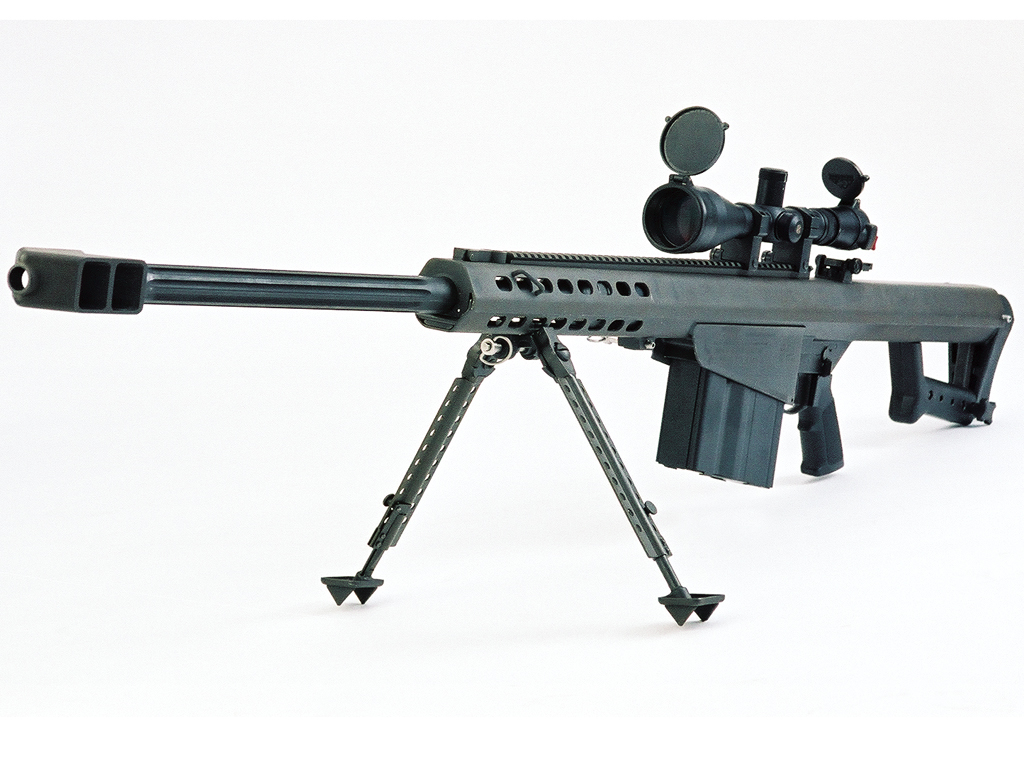
M107

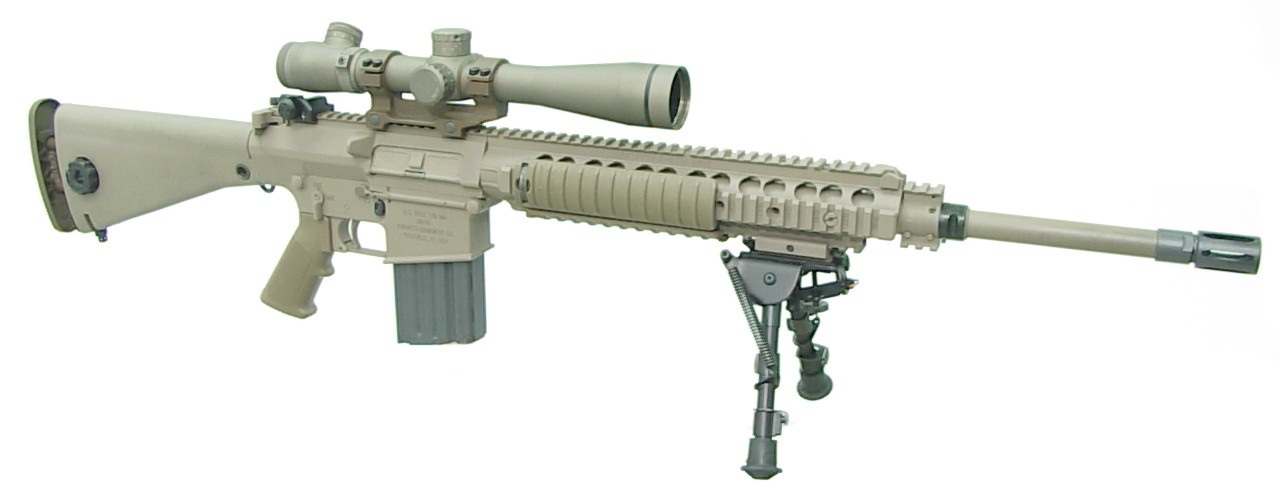
M110 SASS (Semi-Automatic Sniper System)

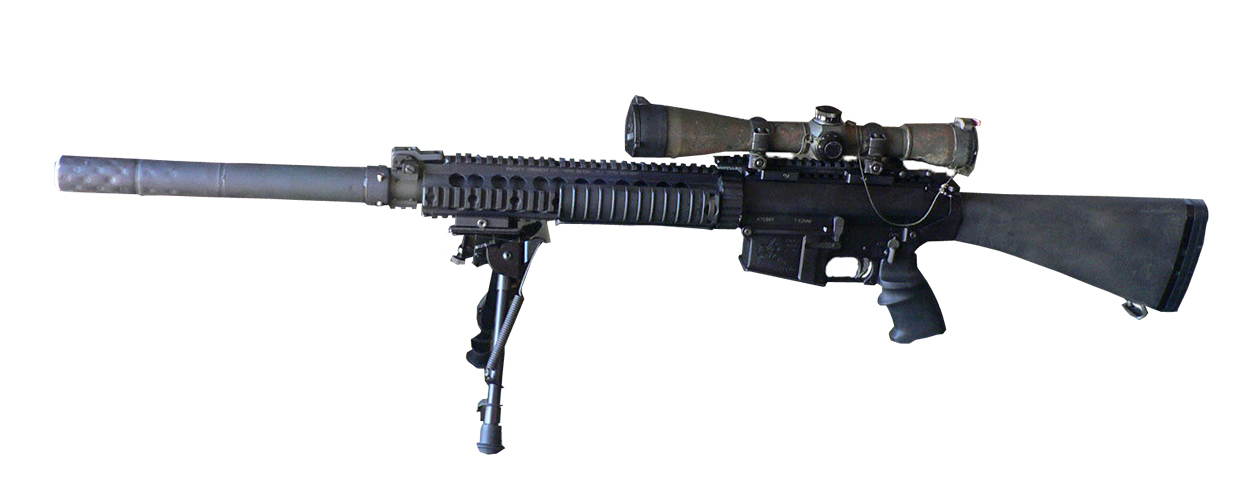
Mk 11

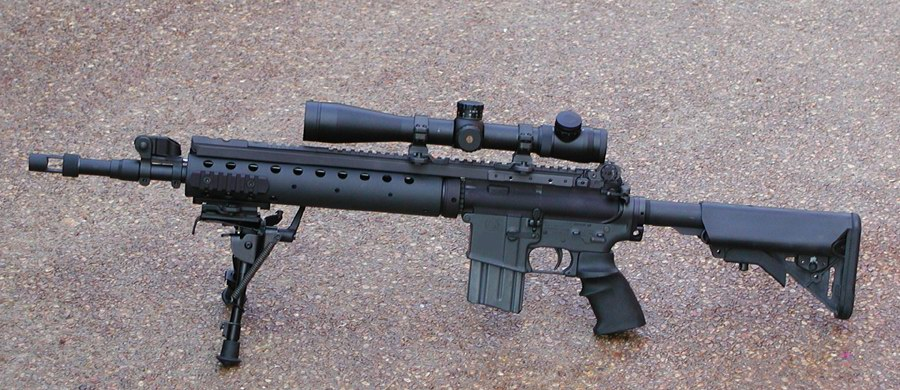
Mk 12 Mod 0 SPR (Special Purpose Rifle)

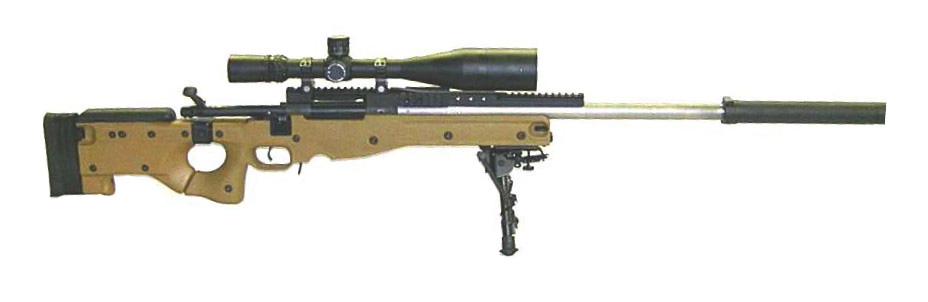
Mk 13 Mod 5 AWM (Arctic Warfare Magnum)

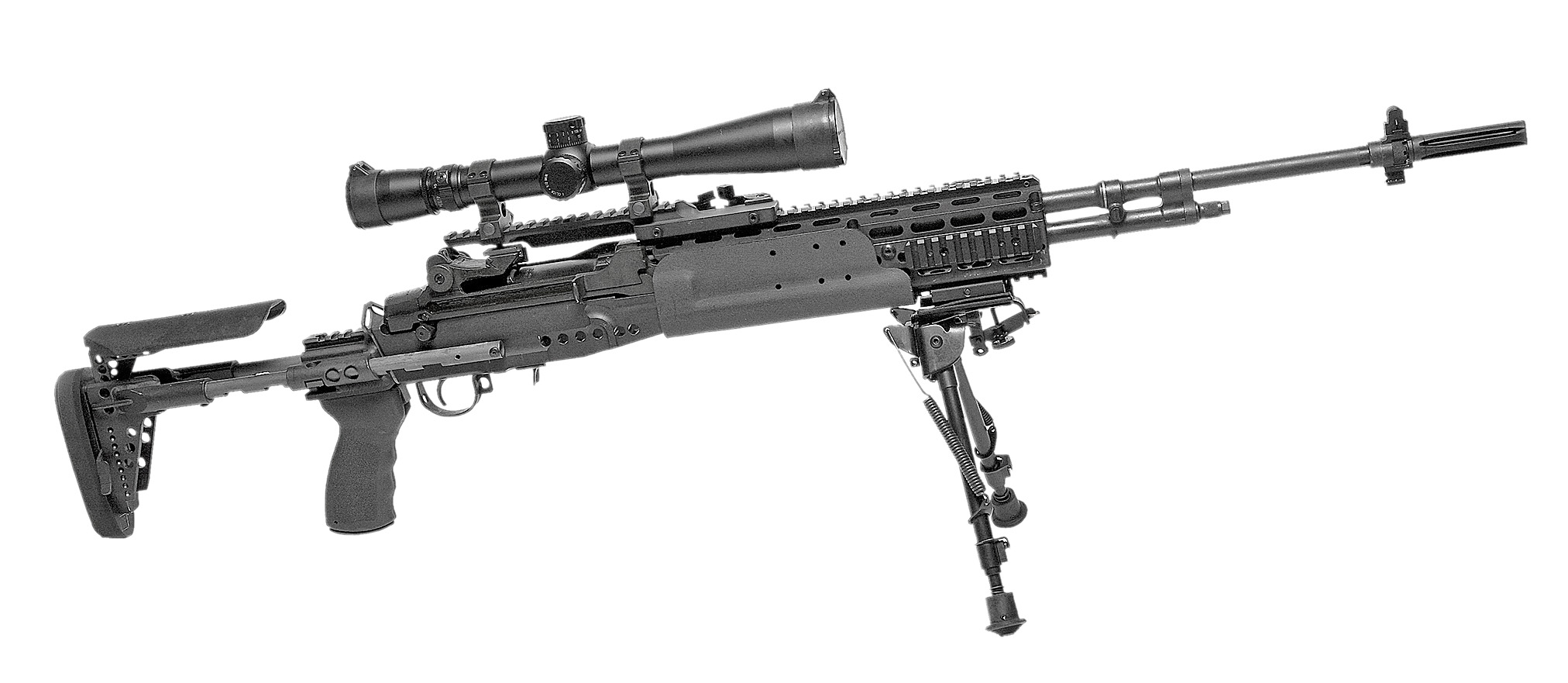
Mk 14 Mod 0 EBR (Enhanced Battle Rifle)

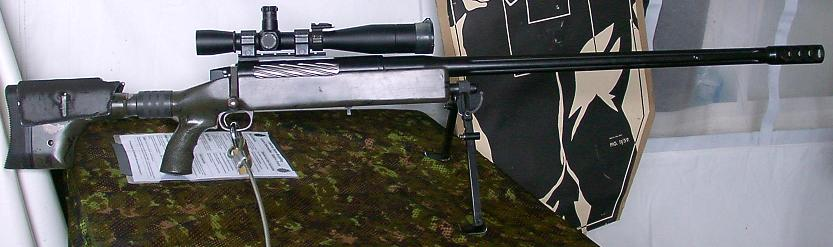
Mk 15 Mod 0 LRSW (long-range sniper weapon)

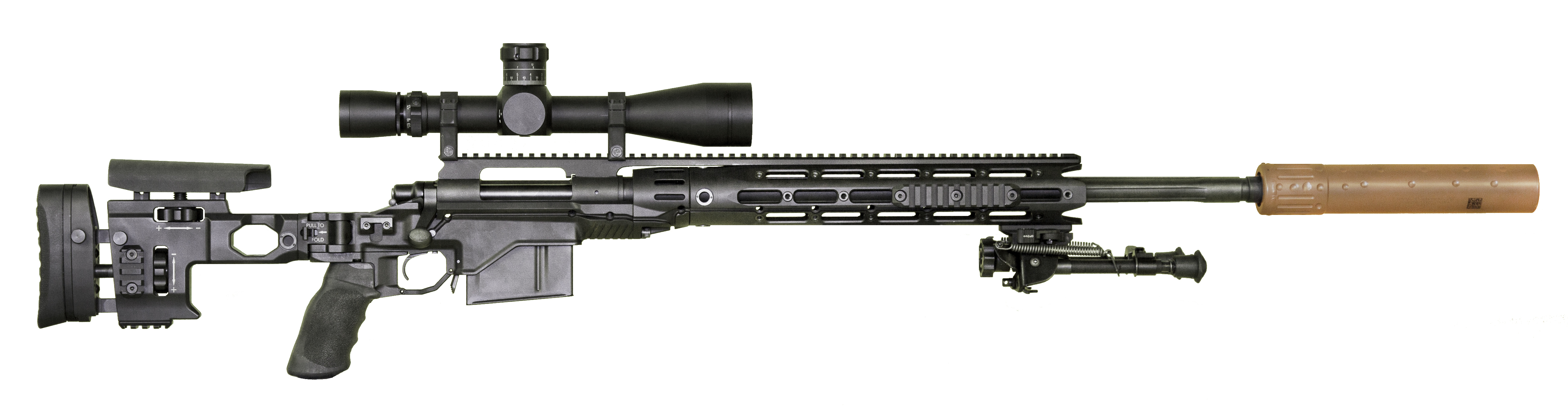
XM2010 ESR (Enhanced Sniper Rifle)

=== Out of service ===
==== Semi-automatic sniper rifles ====
- Mk 11 Mod 1 (Semi-Automatic Sniper Rifle) (7.62×51mm NATO)
- EX 17 Mod 0 SCAR-H (SV) (Semi-Automatic Rifle) (7.62×51mm NATO)
- M21 Sniper Weapon System (Semi-Automatic Sniper Rifle) (7.62×51mm NATO)
- M25 Sniper Weapon System (Semi-Automatic Sniper Rifle) (7.62×51mm NATO)

==== Bolt action sniper rifles ====
- M24 Sniper Weapon System (Bolt Action Sniper Rifle) (7.62×51mm NATO)
- M40 (Bolt Action Sniper Rifle) (7.62×51mm NATO)
- M40A1 (Bolt Action Sniper Rifle) (7.62×51mm NATO)
- M86 (USN SEALs)
- M1903A4 (Bolt Action Sniper Rifle) (.30-06)
- Winchester Model 70 (Bolt-Action Rifle) (.30-06)

==== Anti-materiel rifle ====
- M82A1/A1A (Semi-Automatic Anti-Materiel Rifle) (.50 BMG)
- M82A2 (Semi-Automatic Anti-Materiel Rifle) (.50 BMG)
- Robar RC-50 (Bolt-Action Anti-Materiel Rifle) (.50 BMG)

=== Experimental ===
- XM109 (Semi-Automatic Anti-materiel rifle) (25×59 mm)
- XM500 (Bullpup Semi-Automatic Anti-materiel rifle ) (.50 BMG)

== Machine guns, automatic grenade launchers, and automatic cannons ==
=== In active service ===
==== Light machine guns ====
- M249 Family (Light Machine Gun) (5.56×45mm NATO)

==== Medium machine guns ====
- M60 Family (Medium Machine Gun) (7.62×51mm NATO)
- M240 Family (Medium Machine Gun) (7.62×51mm NATO)
- M134D/GAU-17/A (Rotary-Barreled Medium Machine Gun) (7.62×51mm NATO)
- MG 338 (Medium Machine Gun) (.338 Norma Magnum) (USSOCOM)

==== Heavy machine guns ====
- M2HB/M2A1 (Heavy Machine Gun) (Vehicle and Infantry) (.50 BMG)
- GAU-15/A/GAU-16/A/GAU-18/A (Heavy Machine Gun) (Helicopter Door Mounted) (.50 BMG)
- GAU-21/A (M3M/P) (Heavy Machine Gun) (Helicopter Door Mounted-Faster Firing) (.50 BMG)
- GAU-19/A/B (Rotary-Barreled Heavy Machine Gun) (.50 BMG)

==== Automatic cannons ====
- M61A1/A2 Vulcan/Mk 15 CIWS (Rotary-Barreled Automatic Cannon) (20×102mm) (USAF: F-15C/D, F-15E, F-16C/D, F-22A) (USN: F/A-18A/B/C/D, F/A-18E/F, Nimitz, Ford, Wasp, America, Ticonderoga, Arleigh Burke, Oliver Hazard Perry, Whidbey Island, Harpers Ferry) (USMC: F/A-18A/C/D) (USCG: Hamilton, Legend)
- M197 (Rotary-Barreled Automatic Cannon) (20×102mm) (USMC: AH-1W, AH-1Z)
- GAU-12/U Equalizer (Rotary Barreled Automatic Cannon) (25×137mm) (USAF: AC-130U) (USMC: AV-8B)
- GAU-22/A Equalizer (Rotary Barreled Automatic Cannon) (25×137mm) (USAF: F-35A) (USMC: F-35B) (USN: F-35C)
- M242/Mk 38 Mod 0/2/3 Bushmaster II (Automatic Cannon) (25×137mm) (US Army: Stryker, M2/M3/M6/M7 Bradley) (USMC: LAV-25) (USN: Wasp, Ticonderoga, Arleigh Burke, Oliver Hazard Perry, Cyclone, San Antonio, Whidbey Island, Harpers Ferry) (USCG: Island, Hamilton, Sentinel, USCGC Alex Haley (WMEC-39))
- Mk 44 Mod 0/GAU-23/A/Mk 46 Mod 2 Bushmaster II (Automatic Cannon) (30×173mm) (USAF: AC-130W, AC-130J) (USN: Zumwalt, Independence, Freedom)
- GAU-8/A Avenger (Rotary Barreled Automatic Cannon) (30×173mm) (USAF: A-10C)
- M230 (Automatic Cannon) (30×113mm) (US Army: AH-64D/E, MH-60L, AH-6M)
- L/60 Bofors (Automatic Cannon) (40×311mm) (USAF: AC-130U)

==== Automatic grenade launchers ====
- Mk 19 Mod 3 (Automatic Grenade Launcher) (40×53mm) (US Army, USAF, USN, USMC, USCG, USSOCOM)
- Mk 47 Mod 0 Stryker (Automatic Grenade Launcher) (40×53mm) (USSOCOM)
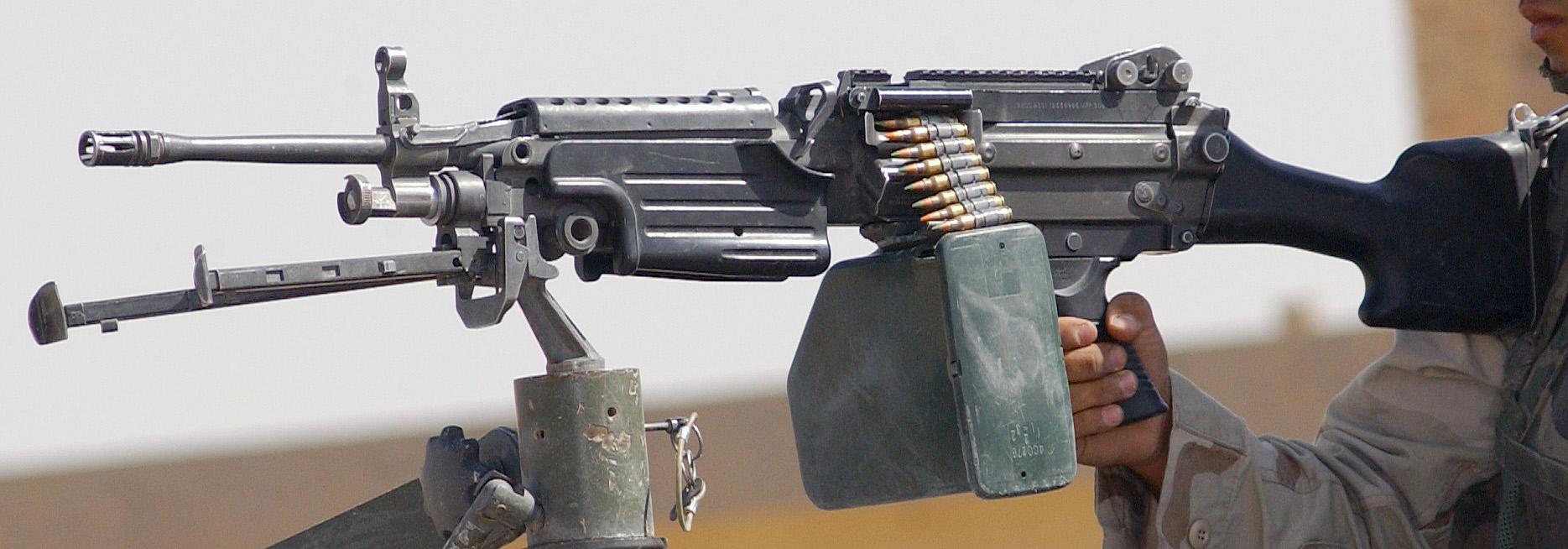
M249

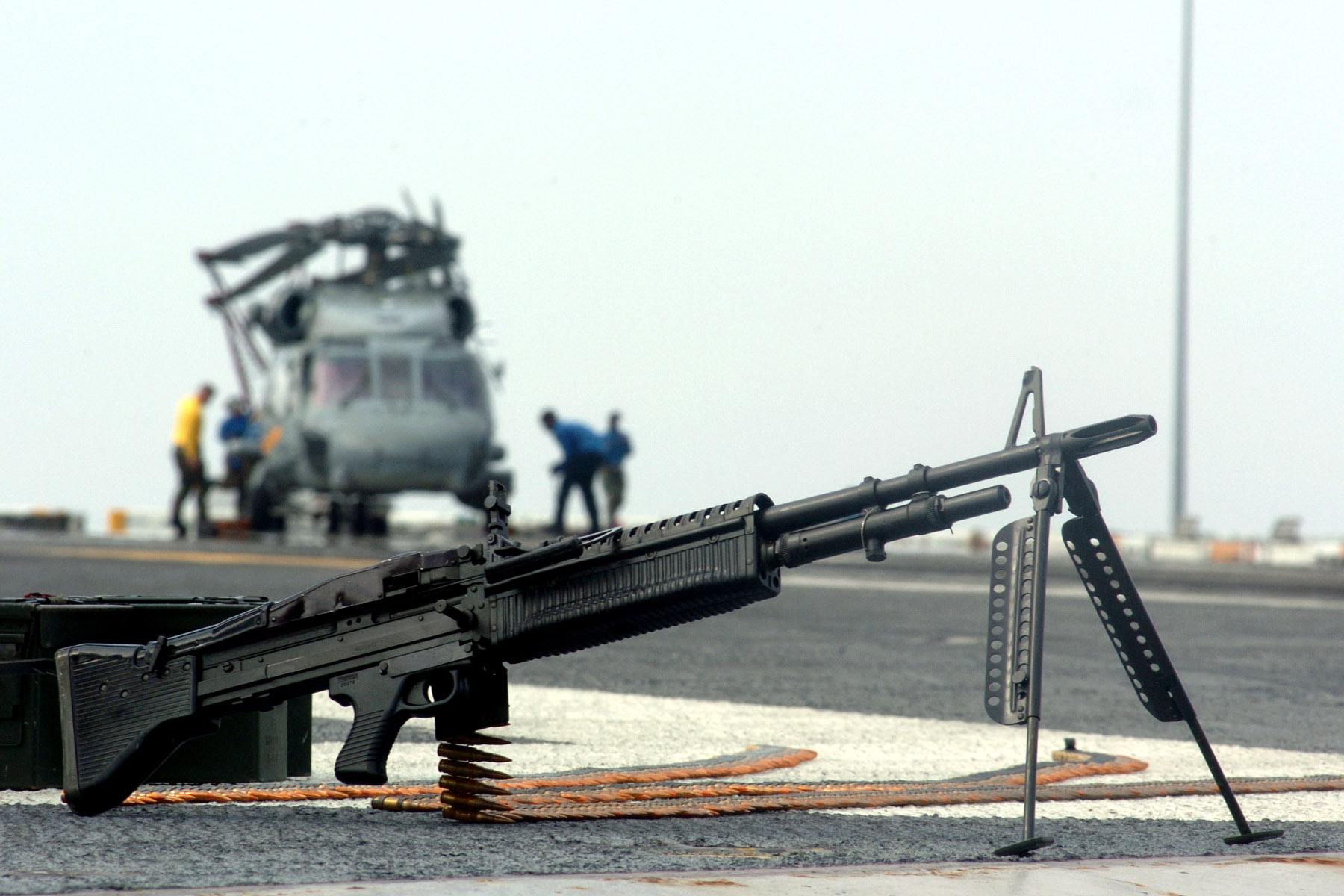
M60

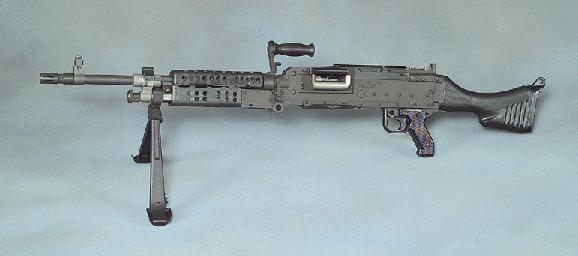
M240

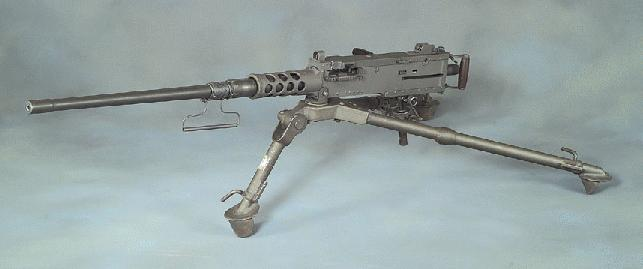
M2

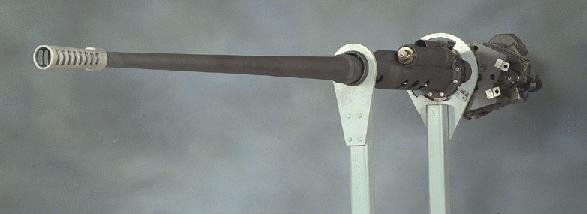
M242 Bushmaster

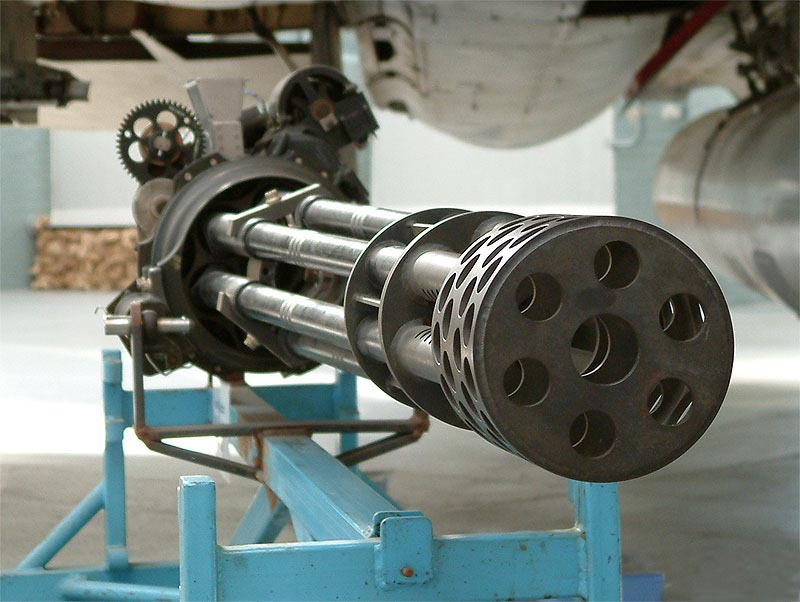
M61 Vulcan

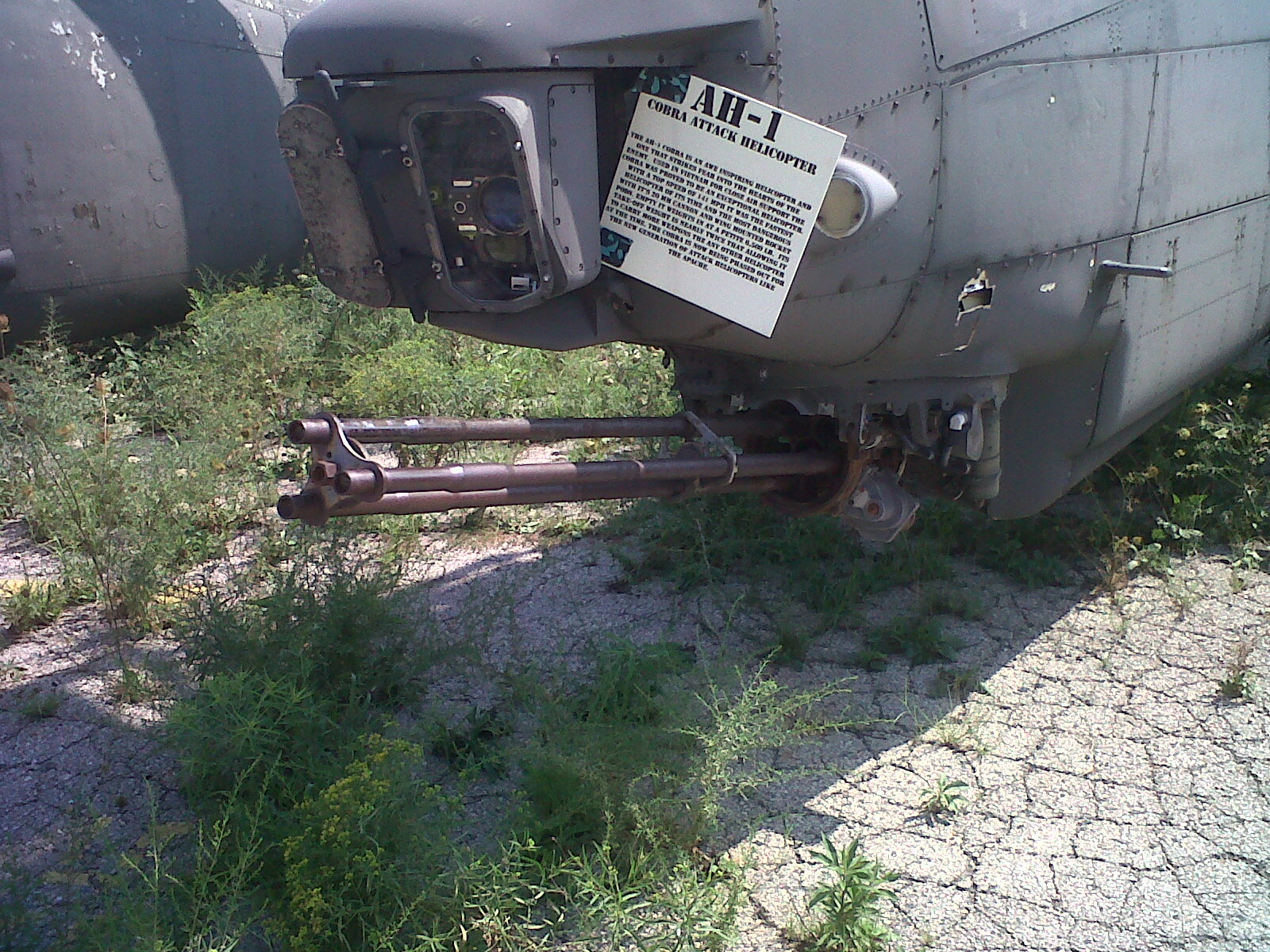
M197

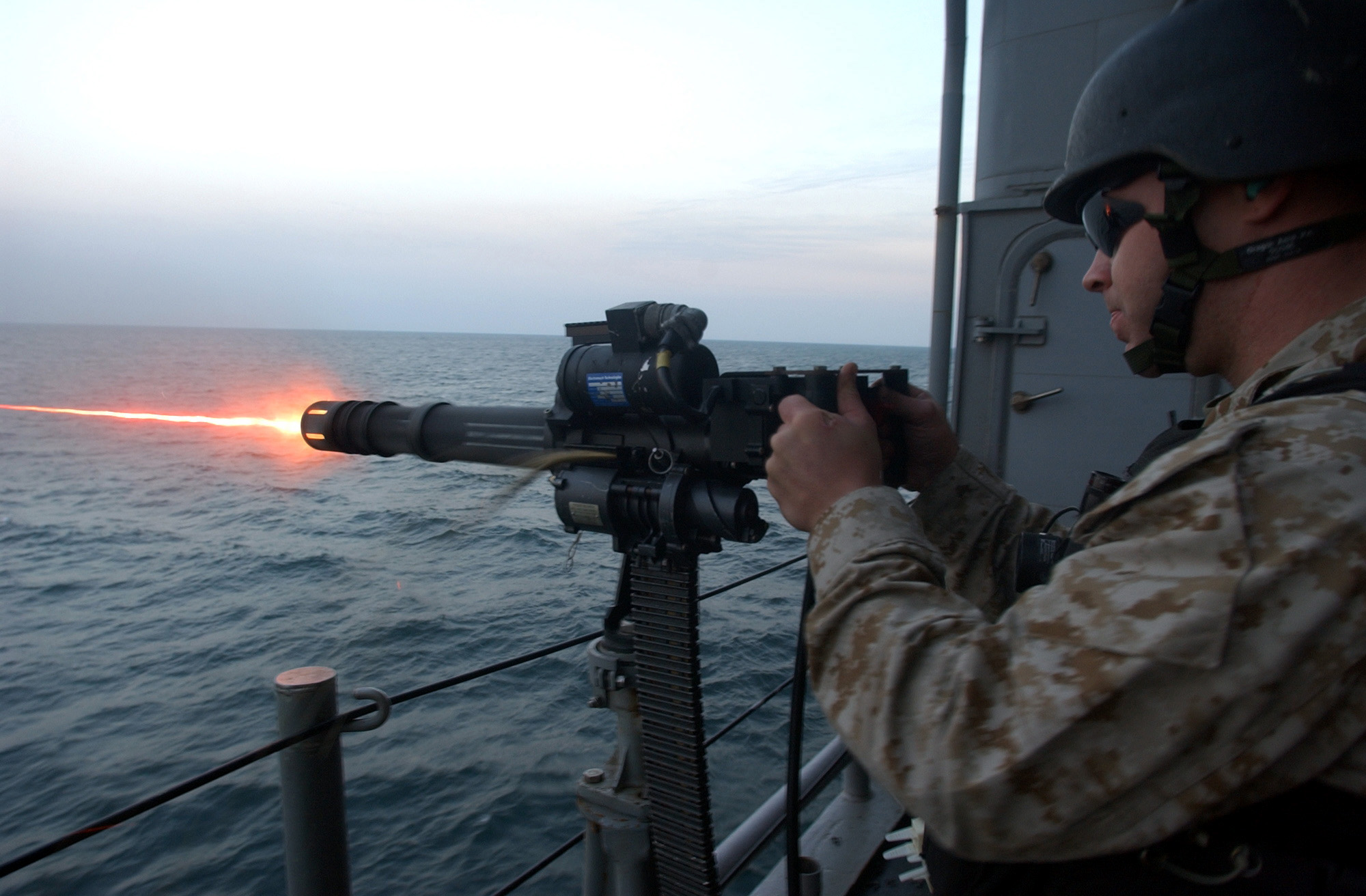
GAU-17/A

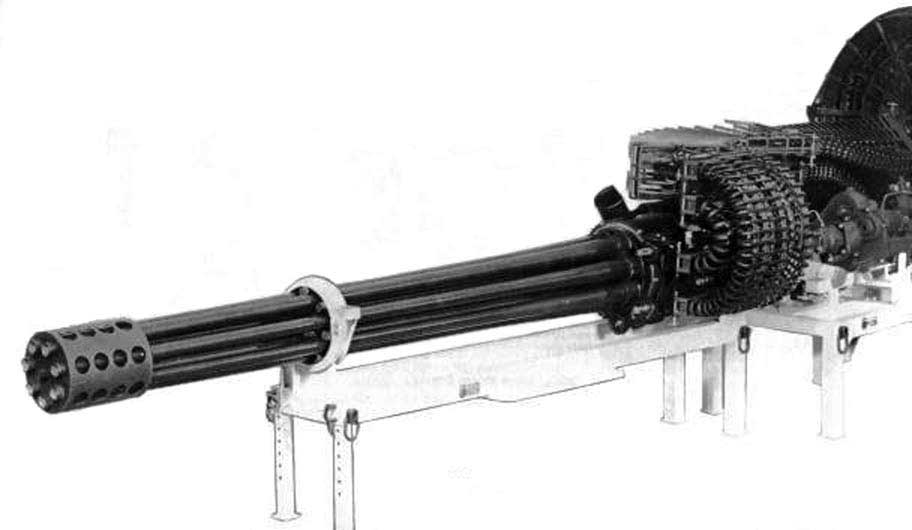
GAU-8 Avenger

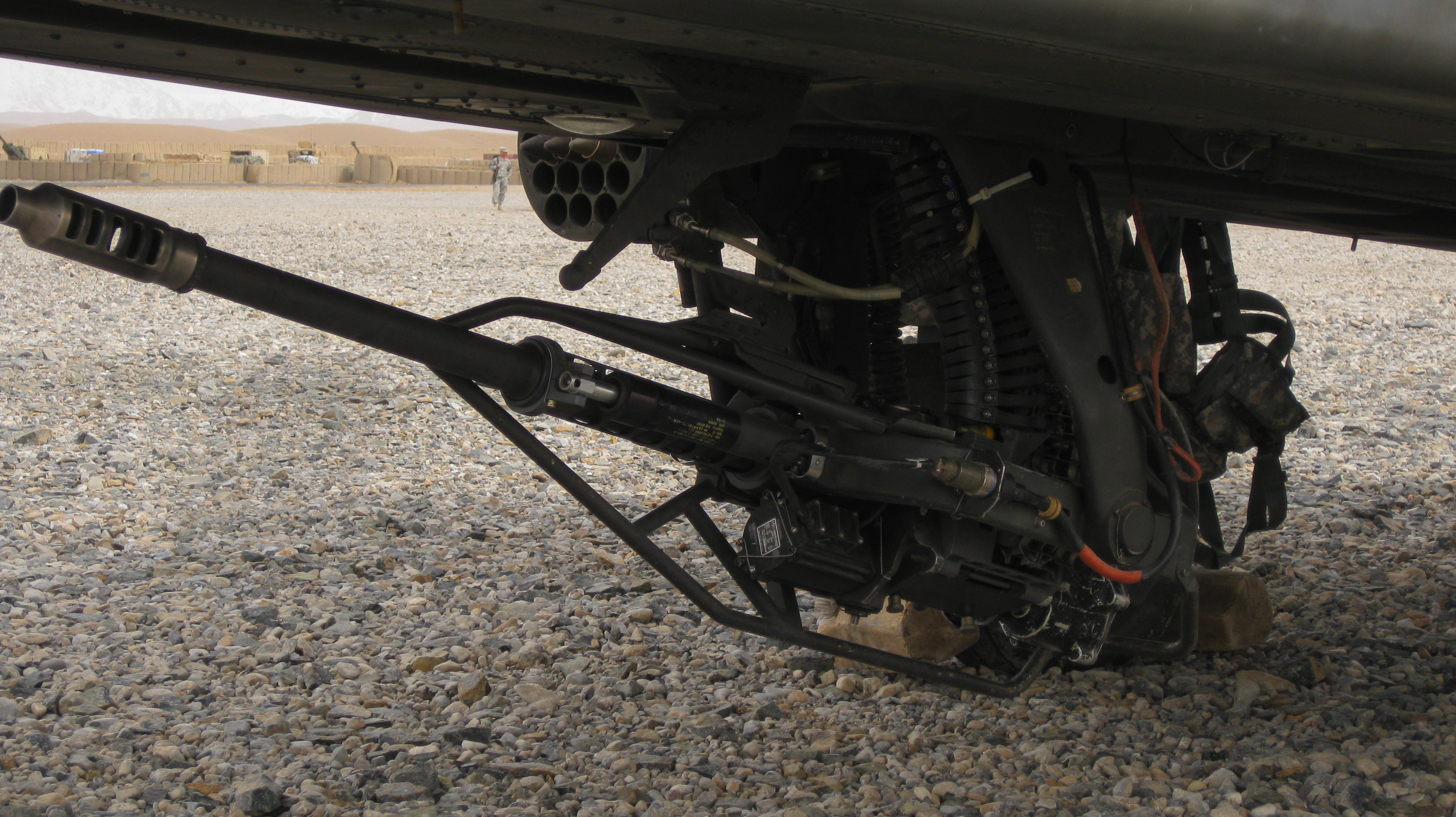
M230

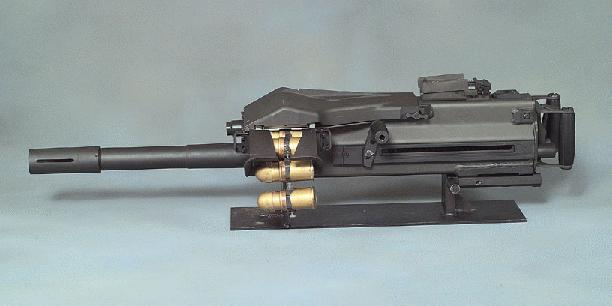
Mk 19 Mod 3

=== Out of service ===
==== Light machine guns ====
- XM214 (Rotary-Barreled Machine Gun) (5.56×45mm NATO)

==== Medium machine guns ====
- EX 34 Mod 0 (Chain-driven Machine Gun, 7.62×51mm NATO)
- M73/A1 (Co-axial Machine Gun, 7.62×51mm NATO)
- M219 (Co-axial Machine Gun, 7.62×51mm NATO)
- M1917 (Heavy Machine Gun, .30-06 Springfield)
- M1919 Family (including Mk 21 Mod 0/1) (Medium Machine Gun, .30-06 Springfield and 7.62×51mm NATO)
- Colt–Browning M1895/1917

==== Heavy machine guns ====
- M85/M85C (Heavy Machine Gun) (.50 BMG)
- XM312 (Heavy Machine Gun) (.50 BMG)
- XM806 (Lightweight Heavy Machine Gun) (.50 BMG) (US Army)

==== Automatic cannons ====
- M1/AN/M2/M3/M24 (Automatic Cannon, 20×110mm USN)
- Mk 16 Mod 4/5 (Automatic Cannon, 20×110mm USN; deck mount versions of the M3 and M24)
- M39A1/A2/A3 (Automatic Cannon, 20×102mm; based on the Mauser MG 213C Cannon)
- Mk 11 Mod 0/5 (Twin-Barrel Automatic Cannon, 20×110mm USN)
- Mk 12 Mod 0 (Automatic Cannon, 20×110mm USN)
- M195 (Rotary-Barreled Automatic Cannon, 20×102mm)
- M140/E3/E5 (Automatic Cannon, 30×100mm)
- M188/E1 (Automatic Cannon, 30×113mm)
- Marlin machine gun

==== Automatic grenade launchers ====
- XM307 (Grenade machine gun, 25 mm HV Airburst)
- M75/M129 (Automatic Grenade Launcher, 40×53mm)
- M174 grenade launcher (Automatic Grenade Launcher, 40×46mm)
- M175 grenade launcher (Automatic Grenade Launcher, 40×53mm)
- Mk 18 Mod 0 grenade launcher (Manually Operated, Belt-Fed Grenade Launcher, 40×46mm)
- Mk 20 Mod 0 (Automatic Grenade Launcher, 40×46mm)

=== Experimental ===
- Mk48 Mod 2
- NGSW-AR
- Knight's Armament Company LAMG
- LSAT light machine gun
- FN EVOLYS
- XM250
- Lightweight Medium Machine Gun (Medium Machine Gun) (.338 Norma Magnum)

== Missile and rocket launchers ==
=== In active service ===
- FIM-92 Stinger (surface-to-air missile) (70 mm)
- FGM-148 Javelin (anti-tank missile) (127 mm)
- BGM-71 TOW (Tube-launched Optically tracked Wire-guided) (anti-tank missile) (152mm)
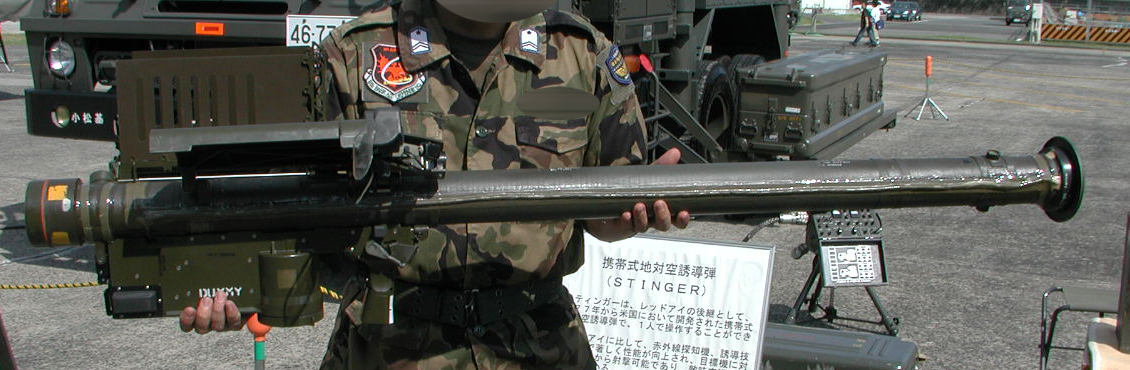
FIM-92 Stinger

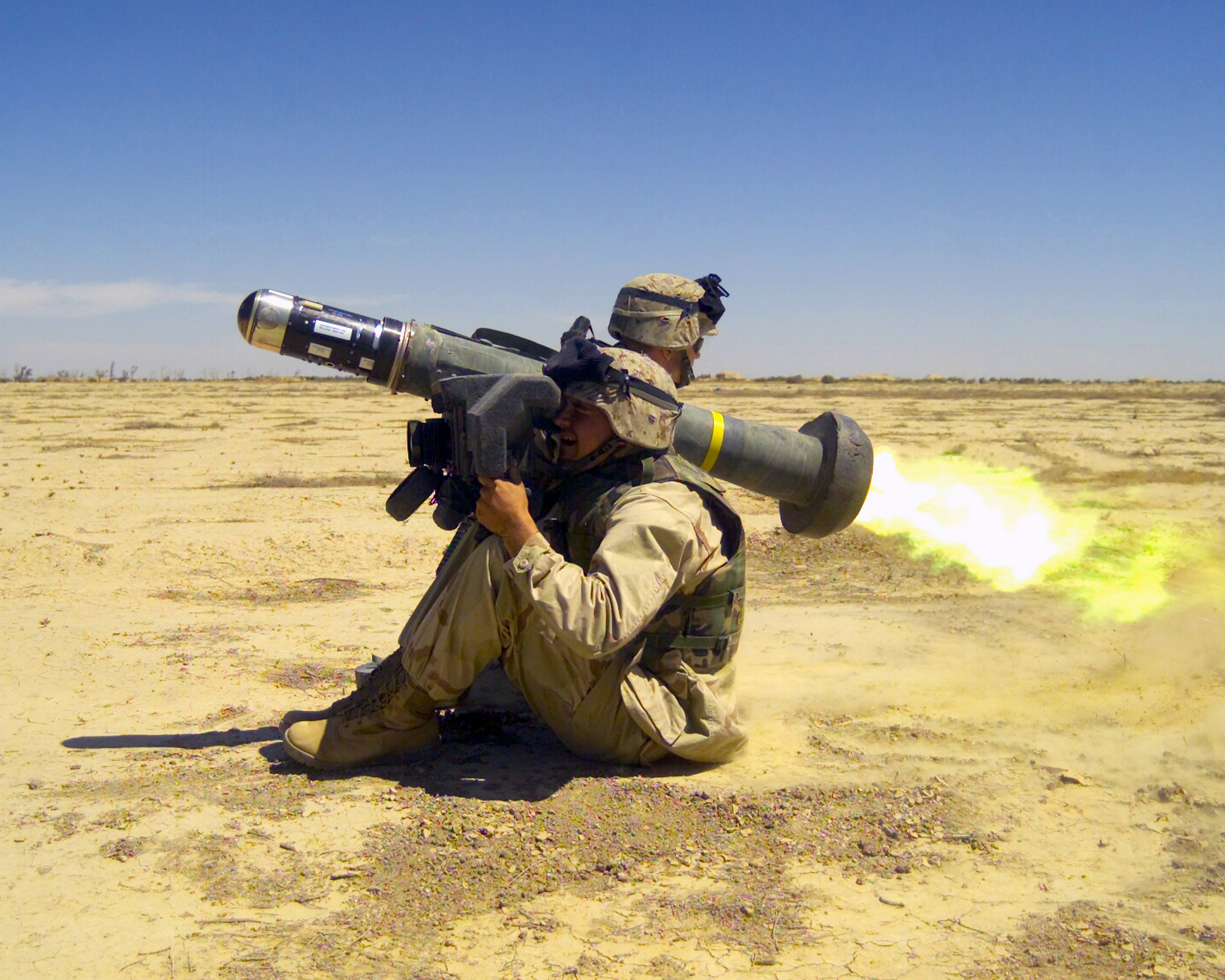
FGM-148 Javelin

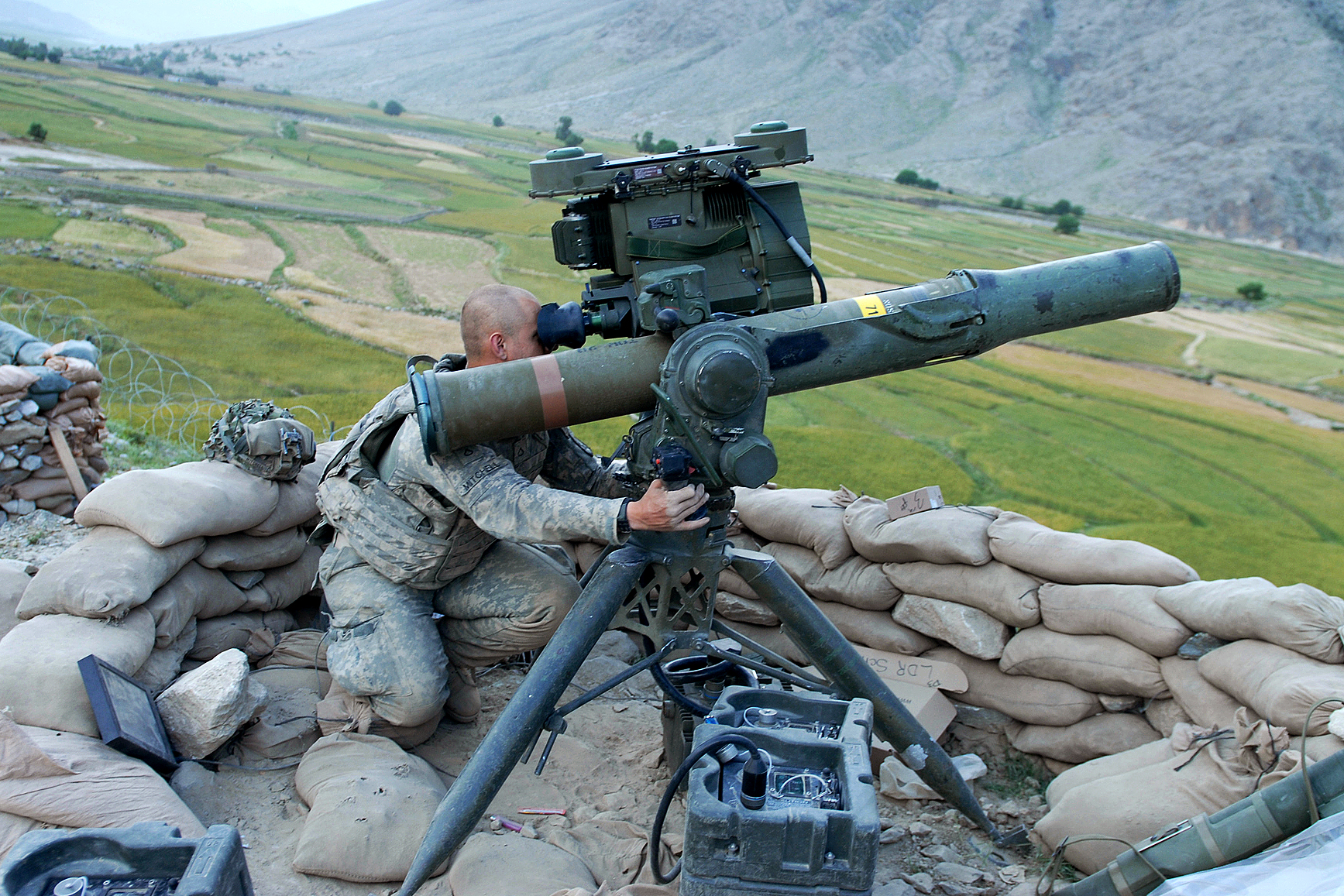
BGM-71 TOW (Tube-launched Optically tracked Wire-guided)

=== In active service (some branches, secondary or limited roles) ===
- Mk 153 Mod 0/2 SMAW (Shoulder-launched Multipurpose Assault Weapon) (anti-fortification, anti-armor rocket) (83.5 mm) (USMC)
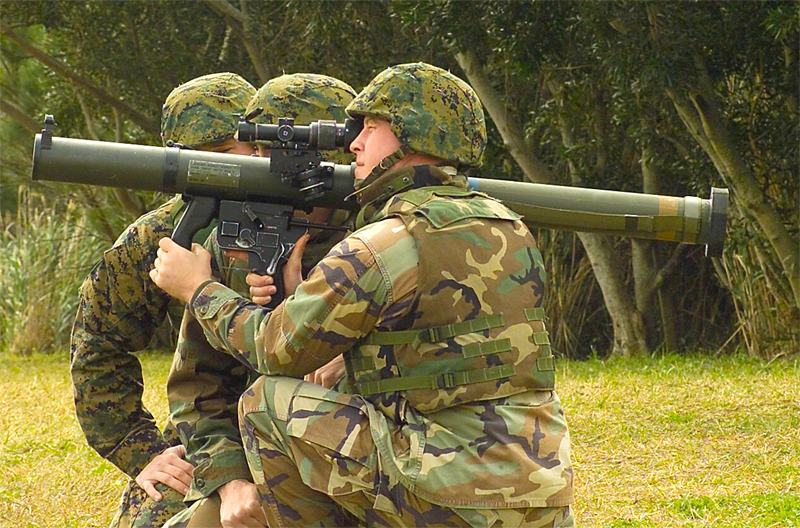
Mk 153 Mod 0 SMAW (Shoulder-launched Multipurpose Assault Weapon)

=== Out of service ===
- FIM-43 Redeye
- M47 Dragon

== Recoilless rifles ==
=== In active service ===
- M3 MAAWS (Multi-role Anti-armor Anti-tank Weapon System) (anti-fortification, anti-armor recoilless rifle) (84 mm)
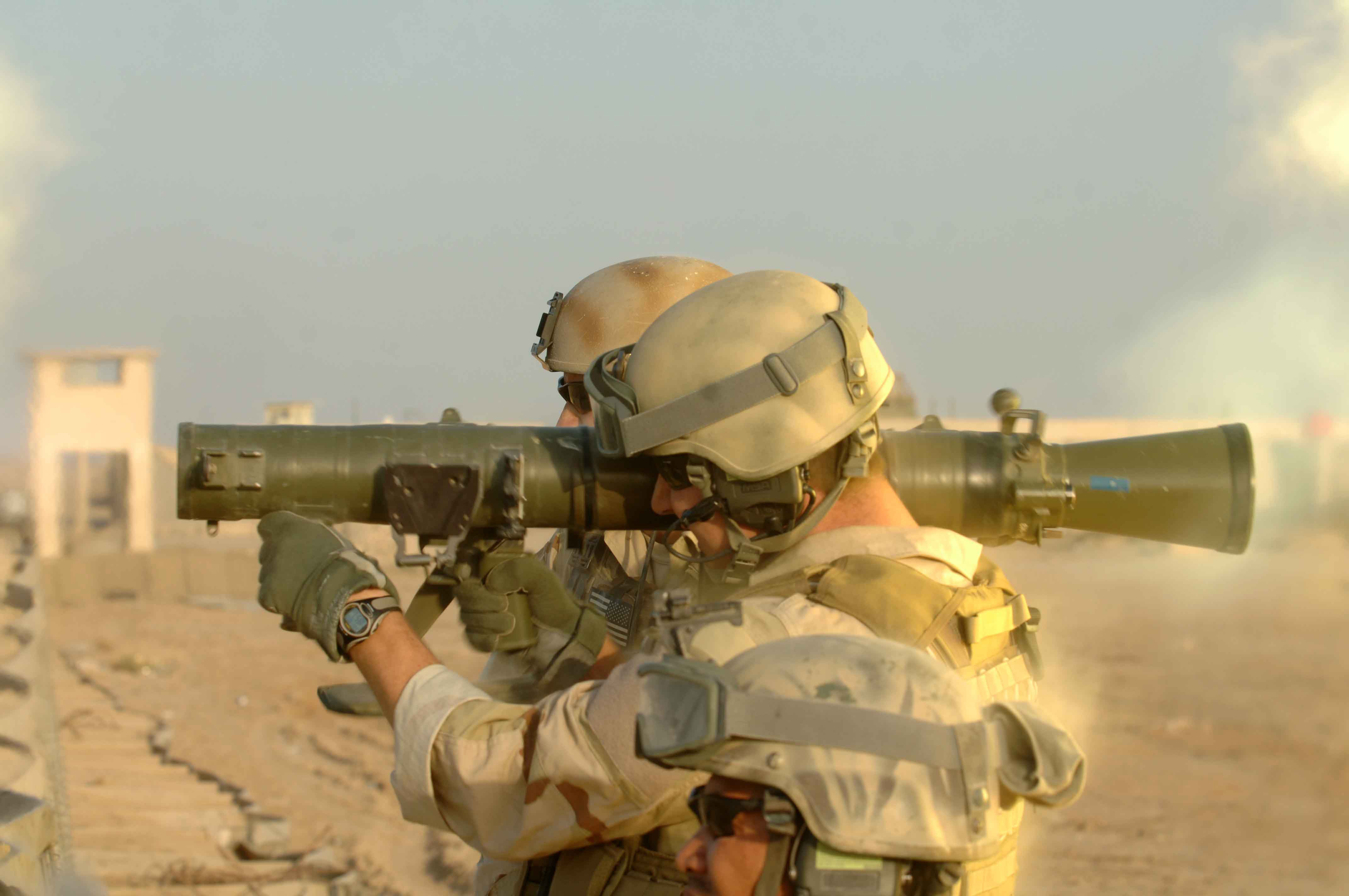
M3 MAAWS (Multi-role Anti-armor Anti-tank Weapon System)

=== Out of service ===
- M67 recoilless rifle (90 mm)
- M18 recoilless rifle (57 mm)
- M20 recoilless rifle (75 mm)
- M27 recoilless rifle (105 mm, developed into M40)
- M40 recoilless rifle (105 mm, called 106 mm to forestall use of incompatible M27 ammunition)

== Mortars ==
=== In active service ===
- M120 120 mm mortar/M121 120 mm mortar (Army)
- M224 60 mm mortar
- M252 81 mm mortar
- M327 EFSS (USMC)
- Cardom (Army)
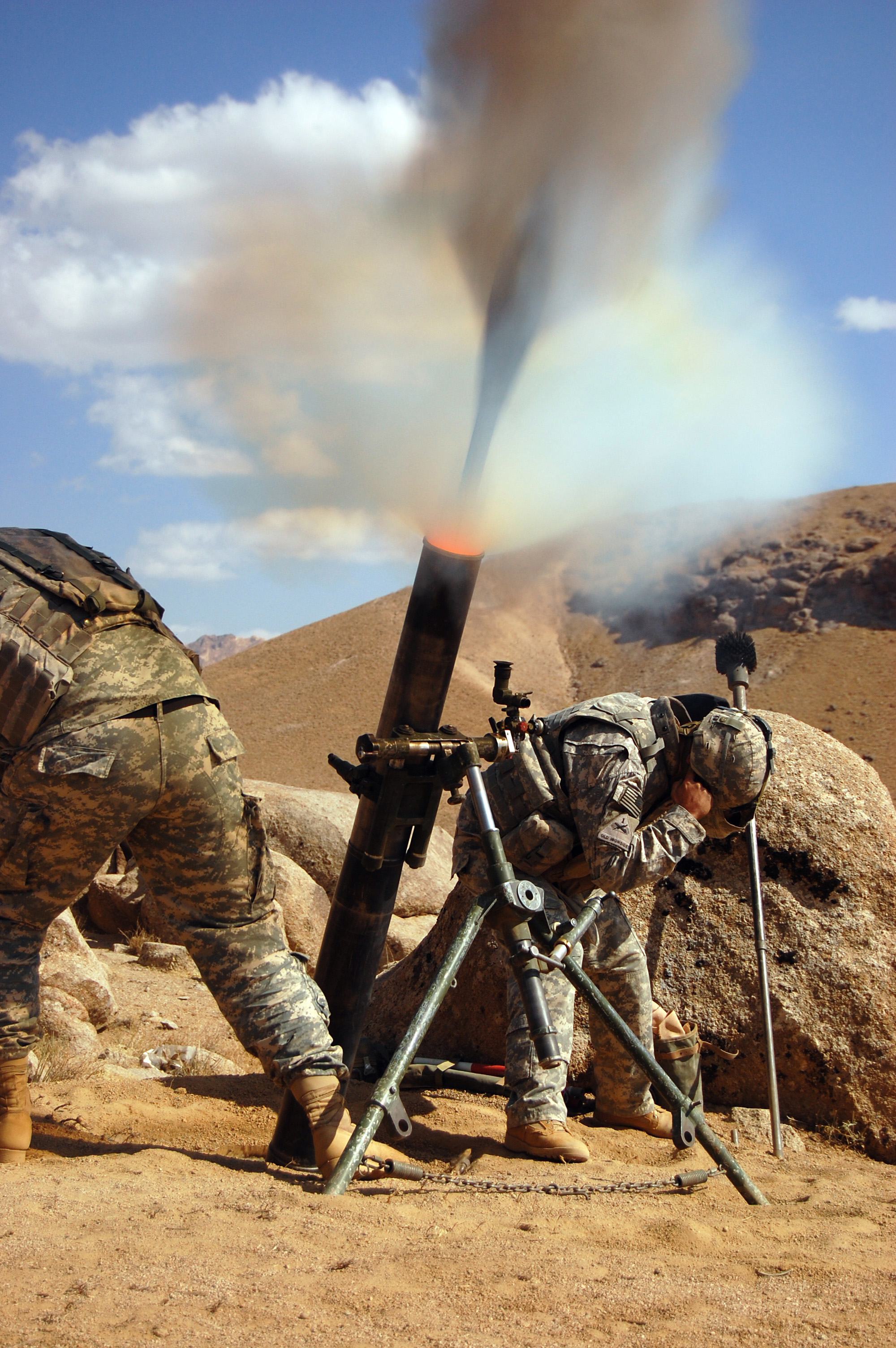
M120

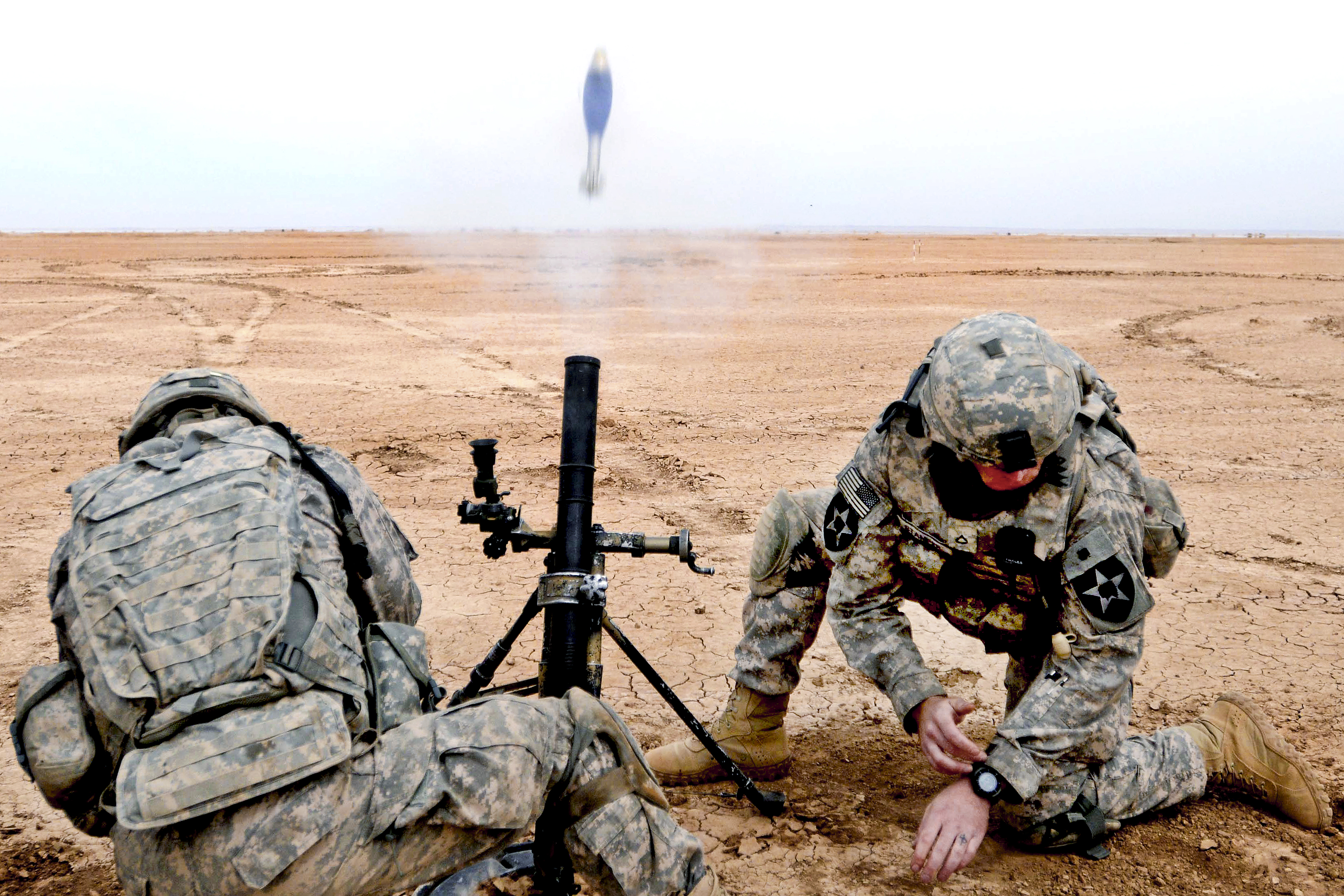
M224

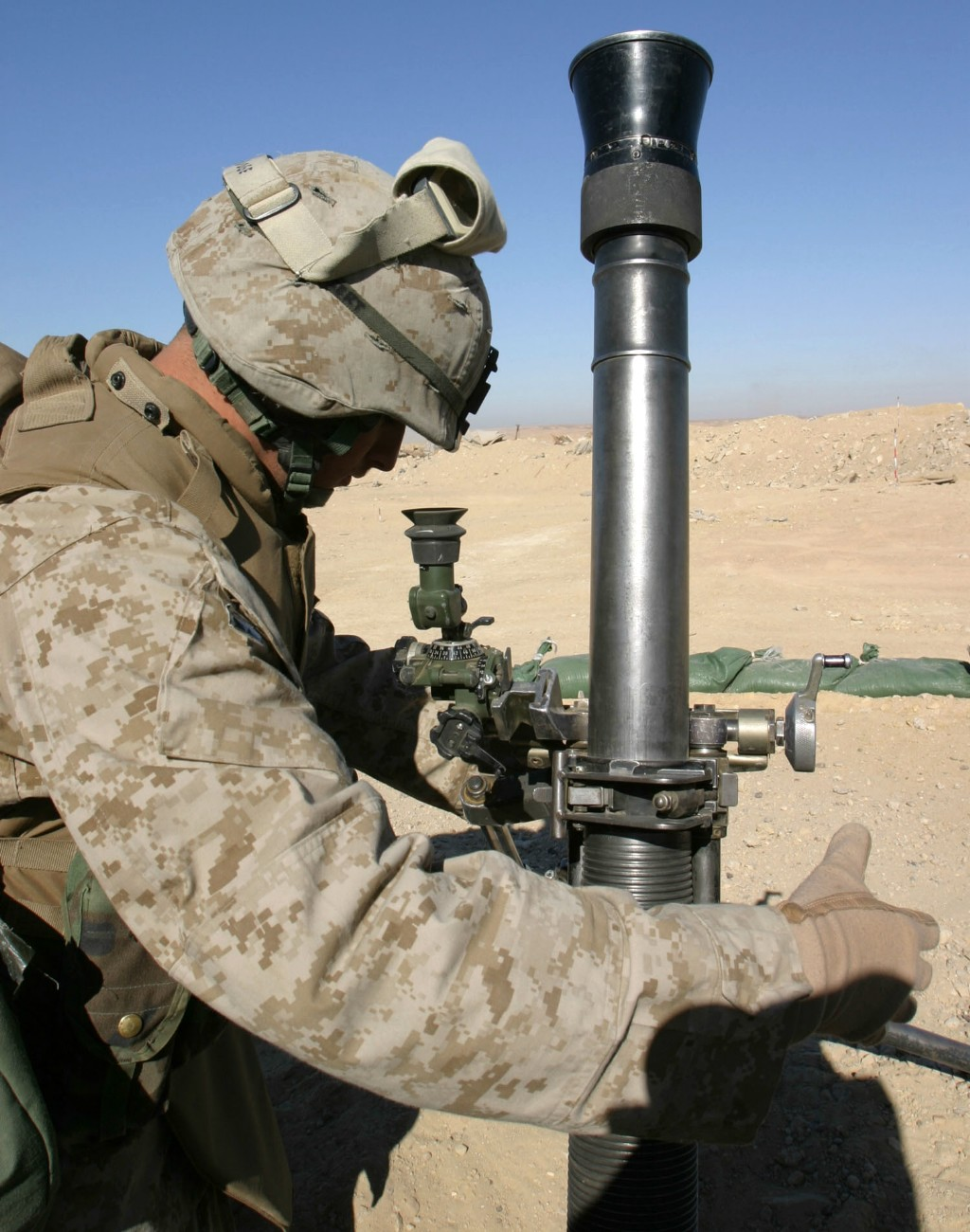
M252

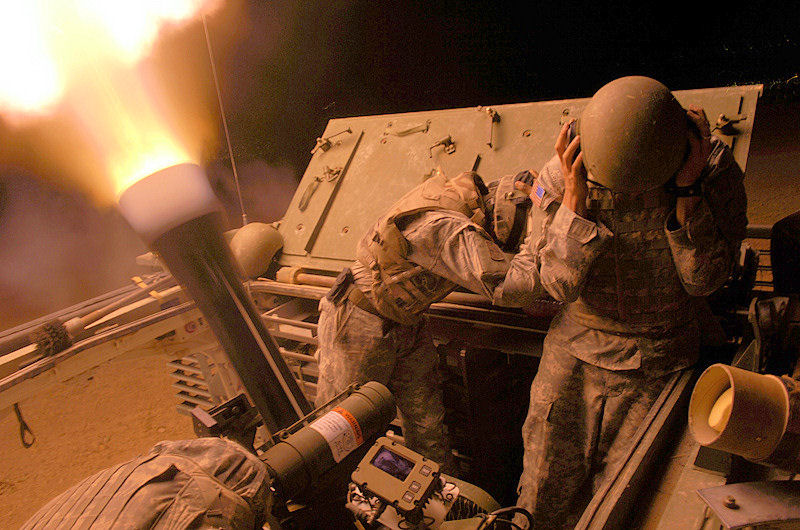
Cardom

=== Out of service ===
- M1 Mortar (81 mm)
- M2 Mortar (60 mm)
- M19 Mortar (60 mm)
- M29 Mortar (81 mm)
- M30 107 mm Mortar
- Mk 2 Mod 0/1 (Breech-loaded Mortar, 81 mm)

=== Experimental ===
- Dragon Fire 120 mm automated mortar
- MFSS 120 mm mortar

== Artillery ==
=== In active service ===
- M119 (105 mm Towed Howitzer)
- M777 (155 mm Towed Howitzer)
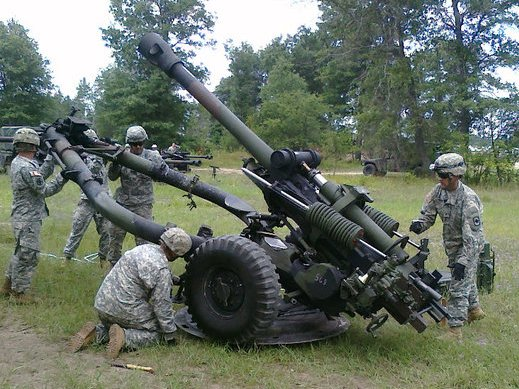
M119A2

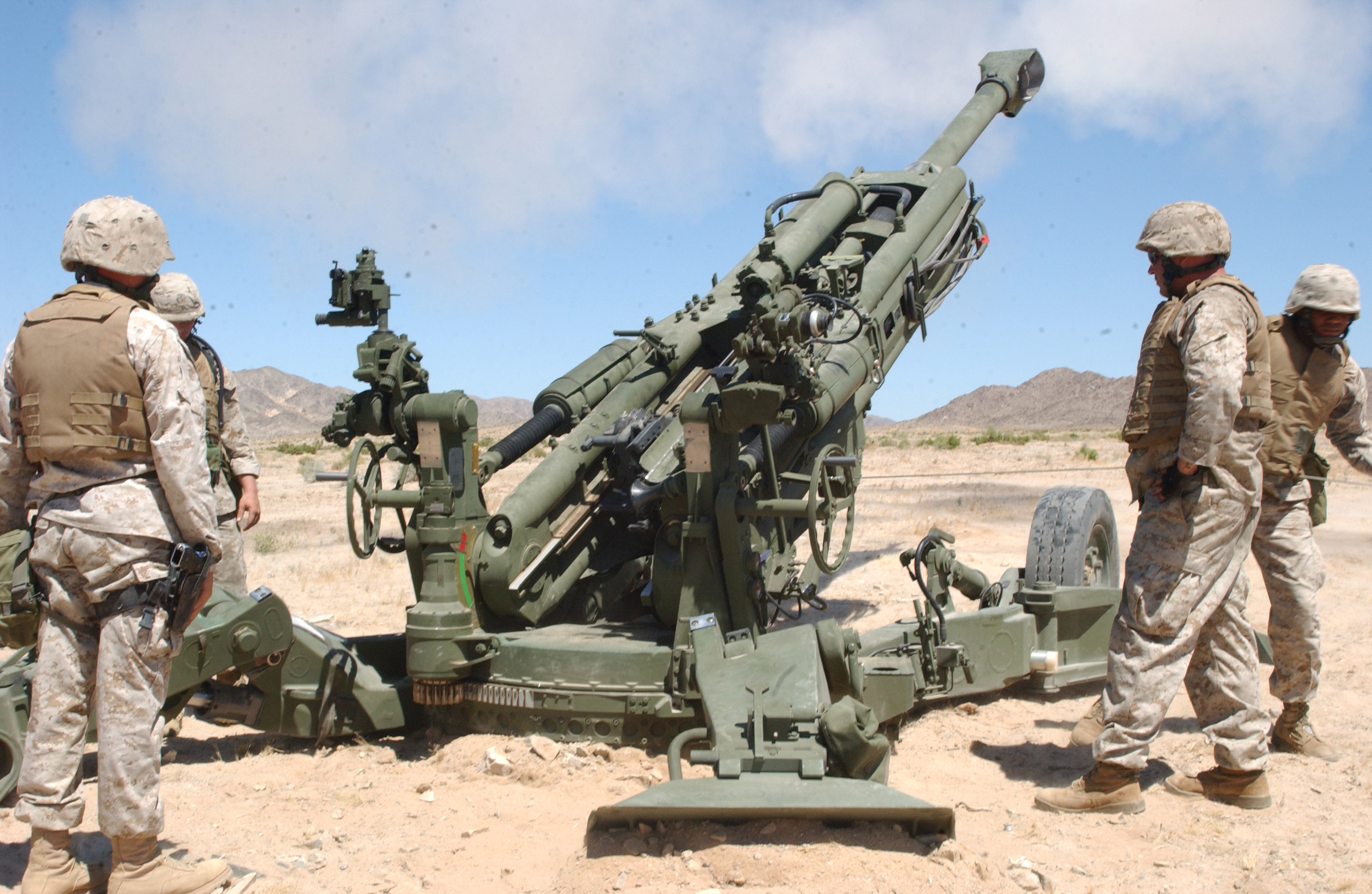
M777

=== In active service (some branches, secondary, or limited roles) ===
- M102 (105 mm Towed Howitzer) (used on USAF AC-130J gunships)

=== Out of service ===
- M59 (155 mm Field Gun)
- M114/A1 (155 mm Towed Howitzer)
- M1/M115 (203 mm/8" Towed Howitzer)
- M110 (203 mm/8" Self-Propelled Howitzer)
- M1902 (76.2mm/3" Field Gun)
- M101/A1 (105 mm Towed Howitzer)
- 3 inch Gun M5
- M116 (75 mm Pack Howitzer)
- M198 (155 mm Towed Howitzer)
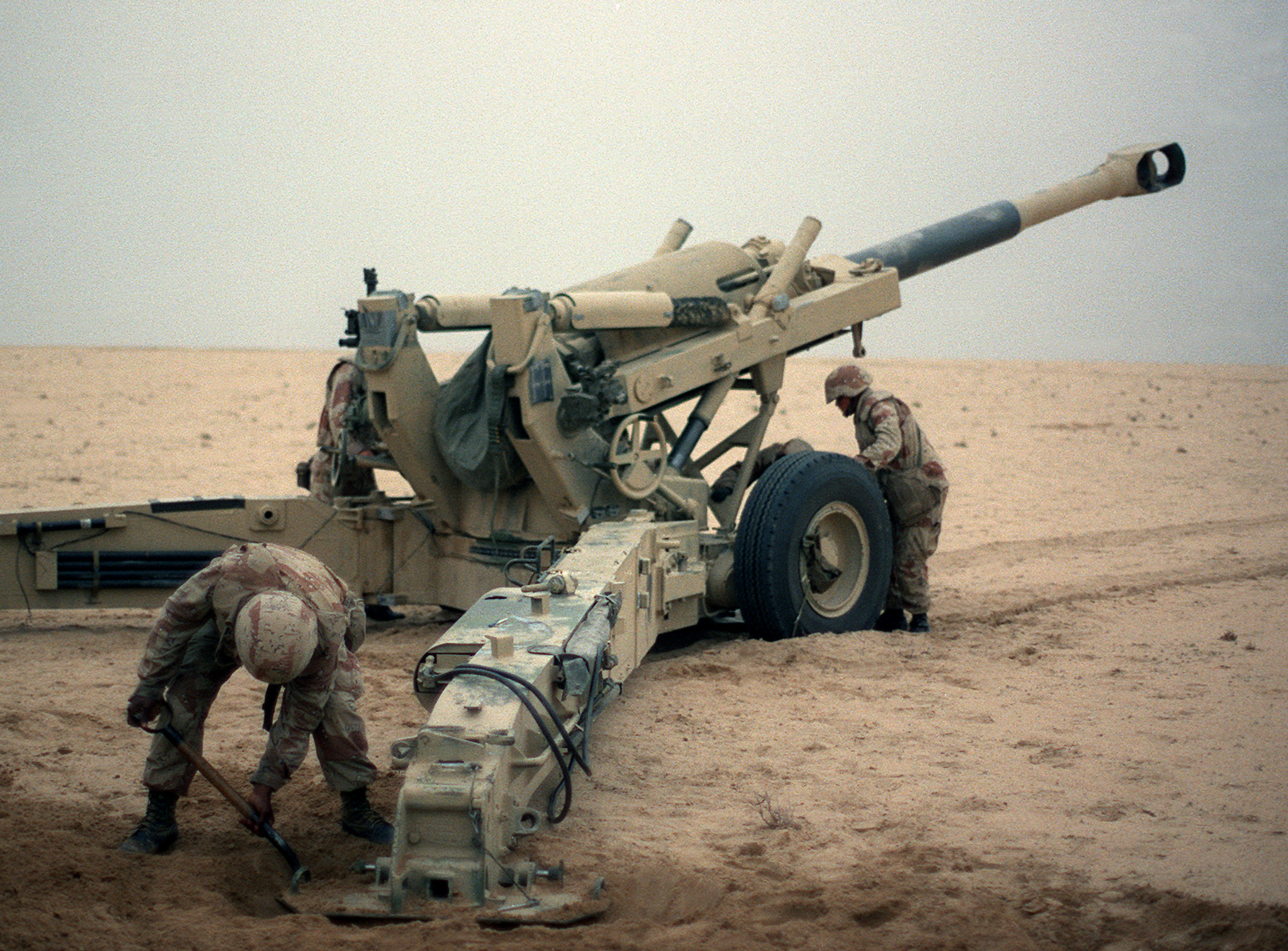
M198

== Munitions systems ==
=== In active service ===
- M7 Spider

=== Experimental ===
- XM1100 Scorpion

== Mine dispenser ==
=== In active service ===
- M139 Volcano

=== Out of service ===
- M128 GEMSS

== Mine-clearing systems ==
=== In active service ===
- APOBS Mk 7 Mod 2
- M58 Mine Clearing Line Charge
- MK155 Mine Clearance Launcher

== See also ==
- List of U.S. Army weapons by supply catalog designation
- List of firearms
- List of individual weapons of the U.S. Armed Forces
- United States hand grenades
- List of vehicles of the U.S. Armed Forces
- List of weapons of the U.S. Marine Corps
- definition of crew-served weapon
