= True Velocity RM338 =

Medium machine gun

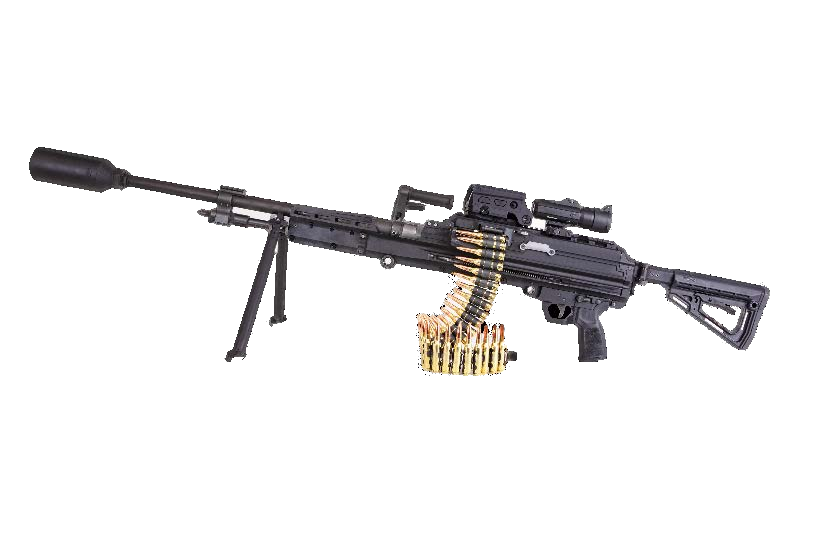
- Prototype of the RM338 (LWMMG) with a suppressor
- Type: General-purpose machine gun; Medium machine gun
- Place of origin: United States

Production history
- Manufacturer: General Dynamics; True Velocity

Specifications
- Mass: 24 lb (11 kg)
- Length: 49 in (1,200 mm)
- Barrel length: 24 in (610 mm)
- Cartridge: .338 Norma Magnum; .338 Lapua Magnum
- Action: Gas-operated long-stroke piston system with Short Recoil Impulse Averaging (SRIA), open bolt
- Rate of fire: 475–550 rounds/min
- Muzzle velocity: 2,650 ft/s (810 m/s)
- Effective firing range: 1,860 yd (1,700 m)
- Maximum firing range: 6,170 yd (5,642 m)
- Feed system: Disintegrating links
- Sights: Picatinny rail for various optical sights

The True Velocity RM338, formerly designated as the Lightweight Medium Machine Gun (LWMMG), is a general-purpose machine gun first developed by General Dynamics, then later by LoneStar Future Weapons, which was later acquired by True Velocity.

The RM338 was originally developed by General Dynamics for Combating Terrorism Technical Support Office (CTTSO) Irregular Warfare program, but was later reintroduced by True Velocity for United States Special Operations Command (SOCOM) LMG-M program.

== History ==
General Dynamics first realized the capability gap being experienced by the U.S. armed forces in Afghanistan around 2010. In many cases, troops were on low ground and being engaged by PKM machine gun fire from the high ground, forcing them to return fire from where they were instead of being able to seek a better position. The M2 machine gun is too heavy for use by dismounted patrols, and rounds from an M240 begin to drift off-target at 800 meters, especially when shooting upwards. At closer ranges, an M240 is accurate but does not have enough penetrating power against hard structures. The Precision Sniper Rifle competition going on at that time also showed that the U.S. military was interested in an infantry general-purpose machine guns with a 1,500-meter range. To achieve desired range capabilities, the .338-caliber was chosen, specifically the .338 Norma Magnum over the .338 Lapua Magnum for several reasons including greater barrel life and a less tapered case for, allowing for better use in push-through metallic disintegrating links. At 1,000 yd (914 m), the 7.62 mm NATO's velocity drops to about 1,000 ft/s (300 m/s); at that range, the .338 Norma Magnum travels at 2,000 ft/s (610 m/s) and out to 1,100 yd (1,006 m), the round is capable of defeating Level III body armor. A machine gun was then designed around the concept and paired with the Short Recoil Impulse Averaging technology, available subsystem components were used to keep the cost down, and has a wide view 6-power scope to enable point target engagement out to 1,100–1,300 yd (1,000–1,200 m). The development of the prototypes was entirely company-funded and took around 12 months. The LWMMG was first unveiled on 15 May 2012 at the Joint Armaments Conference in Seattle, Washington.

An improved LWMMG was displayed at AUSA 2014 with its weight decreased to 22 lb (10.0 kg). Previously, the machine gun underwent a firing demonstration with special operations elements at Camp Roberts, California. When firing from a bipod, the gunners were able to fire directly and hit targets as far out as 1,950 m (2,133 yd). At that range, the LWMMG was able to maintain accurate automatic fire. This showed the LWMMG's significance of hitting targets at longer ranges. Another firing demonstration of the LWMMG is expected to take place in late October at Fort Benning, Georgia.

In April 2021 the technical data package for the LWMMG was sold to LoneStar Future Weapons.

In November 2021, True Velocity Ammo acquired LoneStar Future Weapons and subsequently rebranded the LWMMG as the RM338.

=== Further development ===
The LWMMG prototype was further developed by True Velocity, and was redesignated as the RM338 to compete in the United States Special Operations Command (SOCOM) LMG-M program.

In April 2024, True Velocity filed a lawsuit against SIG Sauer, alleging the SIG Sauer MMG 338 entry submission in the LMG-M program stole their intellectual property on the recoil mitigation system.

On 18 June 2024, True Velocity announced a partnership with FN Browning Group to manufacture the RM338 in the United States by FN America and in the United Kingdom by FN UK.

== Design details ==
The RM338 is designed to fill the gap between 7.62×51 mm NATO and .50 BMG machine guns. The RM338 fires a 300 gr (19 g) .338 Norma Magnum cartridge, and can provide effective and accurate fire out to 1,860 yd (1,700 m), giving it greater lethality compared to the M240 chambered in 7.62 mm NATO cartridge that has an effective range of 1,200 yd (1,100 m). General Dynamics officials say the LWMMG is not meant to be a replacement for the M240, but to give the ability to put effective fire on targets at extended ranges. The RM338 can be mounted on an M240 mount and costs about the same. While the company is satisfied with the shorter .338 Norma Magnum's performance, the machine gun could easily be converted to .338 Lapua Magnum. The short recoil operating system causes the barrel to reciprocate, similar to the M2 machine gun. This combined with a gas system to minimize recoil balances positive and negative recoil forces, allowing a gunner to fire a round with significantly greater energy but with the recoil profile similar to a 7.62 mm round from an M240.

The RM338 is operated by a Gas-operated long-stroke piston system with a rotating bolt located under the barrel and fires from an open bolt. It features the "Short Recoil Impulse Averaging" (SRIA) technology, patented by General Dynamics and previously used on the XM806 machine gun, where the entire barrel, barrel extension, gas system, and bolt assembly recoil inside the outer housing. The RM338 is equipped with a quick-change barrel, quad picatinny rails, collapsible stock, and can be used by dismounted troops or mounted on a platform.

The RM338 has a cyclic rate of fire of around 475–550 rounds per minute, while the LWMMG prototype was at 500 rounds per minute. It has an effective range of 1,860 yd (1,700 m), and a maximum range of 6,170 yd (5,642 m). It weighs 24 lb (11 kg), making it only slightly heavier than the M240L, and 3 lb (1.4 kg) lighter than the M240B. The .338 Norma Magnum has over 6,300 J (4,600 ft⋅lb) of muzzle energy and is four times more powerful than the 7.62 mm NATO at 1,000 meters. An individual round is twice as heavy (45.5 grams compared to 24 grams), as are each belt link (8 grams compared to 4 grams). The standard RM338 weighs 10.8 kg (24 lb) plus a belt of 500 .338 Norma Magnum rounds that would weigh at 37.6 kg (83 lb), while an M240B weighs 12.5 kg (28 lb) plus a belt of 800 7.62 mm NATO rounds that would weigh at 34.9 kg (77 lb).

== See also ==
- SIG Sauer MMG 338
- Overmatch
