= SIG Sauer MMG 338 =

Medium machine gun

- Type: General-purpose machine gun; Medium machine gun
- Place of origin: United States

Service history
- Used by: See Users
- Wars: Gaza war

Production history
- Manufacturer: SIG Sauer

Specifications
- Mass: 25.5 lb (11.6 kg)
- Length: 50.5 in (1,280 mm)
- Barrel length: 24 in (610 mm)
- Cartridge: .338 Norma Magnum
- Action: Gas-operated short-stroke piston with a proprietary recoil mitigation system, open bolt
- Rate of fire: 600 rounds/min
- Muzzle velocity: 2,650 ft/s (810 m/s)
- Effective firing range: 1,860 yd (1,700 m)
- Maximum firing range: 6,170 yd (5,640 m)
- Feed system: 50- or 100-round belts in ammo carrier

The SIG Sauer MMG 338, formerly known as the MG 338 is a medium machine gun chambered in .338 Norma Magnum, manufactured by SIG Sauer.

== History ==
In 2017 United States Special Operations Command (SOCOM) issued a solicitation for a .338 Norma Magnum machine gun. This was in response to the need for overmatch when examining the capabilities of the 5.56×45mm NATO and 7.62×51mm NATO rounds compared to 7.62×54mmR. The MMG 338 was planned to have a similar weight to the M240 but, with the .338 Norma Magnum, deliver terminal ballistics on targets similar to that of the .50 BMG. Programs for acquisition of .338 Norma Magnum ammunition began in 2018. Acquisition of the MMG 338 began in 2019. The MMG 338 was first unveiled at AUSA 2018.

The development of the MMG 338 also led to the design of the NGSW M250 light machine gun, chambered in 6.8×51mm cartridge. At one point, the MMG 338 was referred to as the SL MAG.

The MMG 338 passed its U.S. military safety evaluations in 2020. The US Army also looked at adopting the MMG 338 alongside SOCOM, and it was also evaluated by the Marine Corps' MARSOC.

=== Military adoption ===
In 2025, the Israel Defense Forces announced that it had adopted the MMG 338, designated as the "Orim", and had deployed it with its frontline and special forces units during the Gaza war.

== Design details ==
The SIG MMG 338 is primarily chambered in .338 Norma Magnum and has an effective range of approximately 1,700 meters, approximately twice the effective range of 7.62x51mm NATO, while at 1,000 meters, it is still capable of penetrating Level III armor.

The MMG 338 can be switched to chamber either the 6.8×51mm or 7.62×51mm NATO by changing out the barrel, bolt, feed tray, and feed cover. It weighs approximately 11.5 kg (25 lb), which is lighter than the 12.5 kg (28 lb) weight of the M240. The MMG 338 uses a gas-operated short-stroke system combined with a proprietary recoil mitigation system and is select fire, capable of both automatic and semi-automatic fire.

The MMG 338 is fully ambidextrous and is capable of being fed and charged from the right or left side which can make mounting the machine gun to various vehicles easier. It can also be loaded from the closed or open bolt position. Standard configuration uses an AR style handgrip and folding buttstock. The MMG 338 is also paired with an NGS (Next Generation Suppressor) suppressor made by SIG Sauer and has gas settings for firing suppressed or unsuppressed. Optics are mounted to the frame of the MMG 338 which avoids issues with mounting optical sights to the feed tray. A separate acquisition program for a fire control system was underway as of 2021. Recoil is managed via a proprietary system which allows the barrel to shift backward, reportedly reducing the felt recoil to slightly more than an M4 carbine.

== Users ==
- Israel: Used by the Israel Defense Forces.
- United States: Used by the United States Special Operations Command.

== See also ==
- True Velocity RM338
