= M252 mortar =

British-designed medium weight mortar

M252
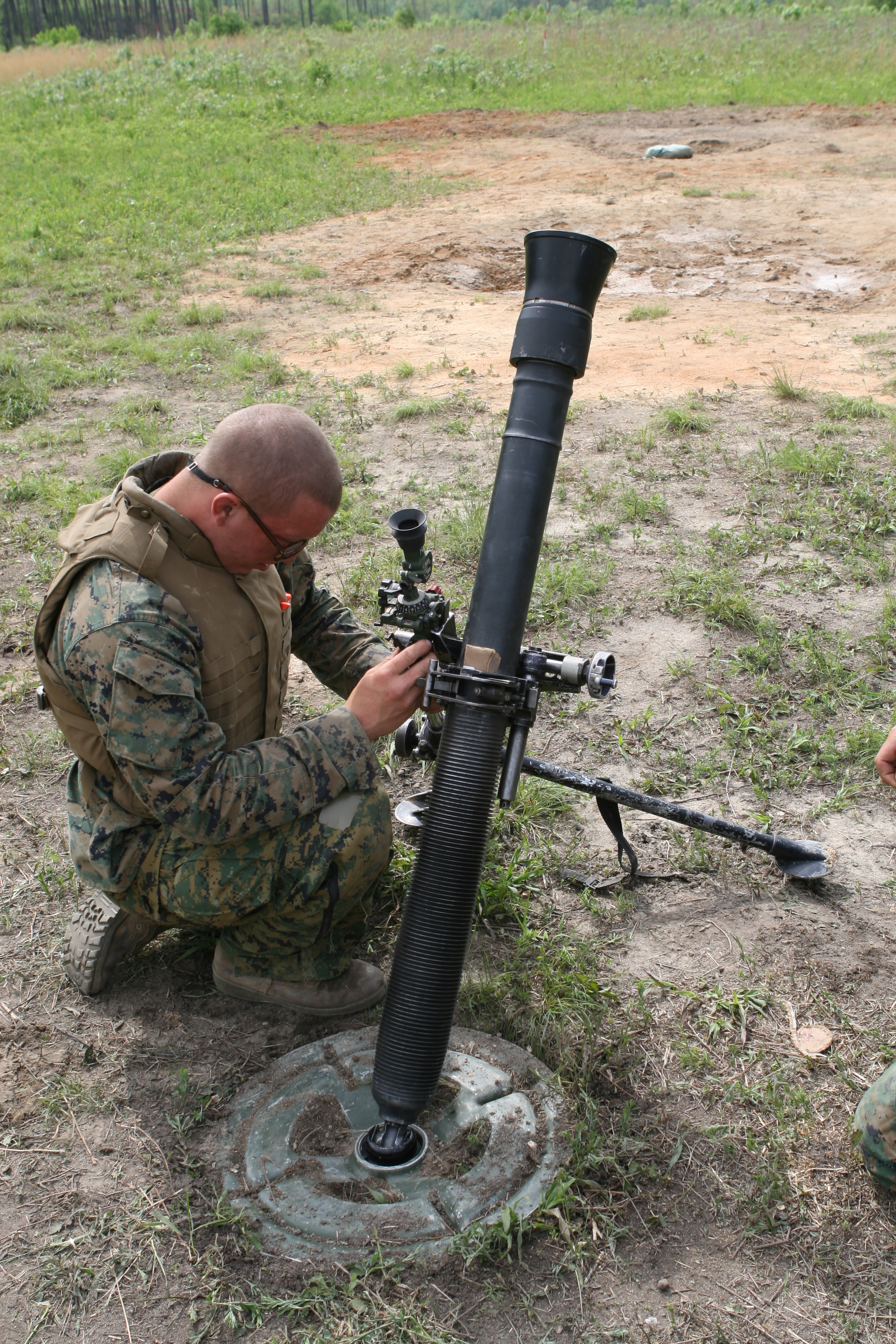
- M252 mortar
- Type: Mortar
- Place of origin: United Kingdom (designed); United States (manufactured)

Service history
- In service: 1987–present (United States)
- Used by: See Operators
- Wars: Vietnam War (prototype model); Soviet–Afghan War; Gulf War; War in Afghanistan; Iraq War; Syrian Civil War

Specifications
- Mass: 41.3 kilograms (91 lb)
- Barrel length: 1.27 metres (4 ft 2 in)
- Crew: 5
- Caliber: 81 millimetres (3.2 in)
- Elevation: 45°–85.2°
- Traverse: 5.6°
- Rate of fire: 8–16 rpm sustained 20–30 rpm in exceptional circumstances and for short periods
- Effective firing range: HE: 91–5,935 m (99–6,490.6 yd)
- Feed system: muzzle-loaded

The M252 81 mm medium weight mortar is a British-designed smooth bore, muzzle-loading, high-angle-of-fire weapon used for long-range indirect fire support to light infantry, air assault, and airborne units across the entire front of a battalion zone of influence. In the U.S. Army and U.S. Marine Corps, it is normally deployed in the mortar platoon of an infantry battalion.

== Design ==
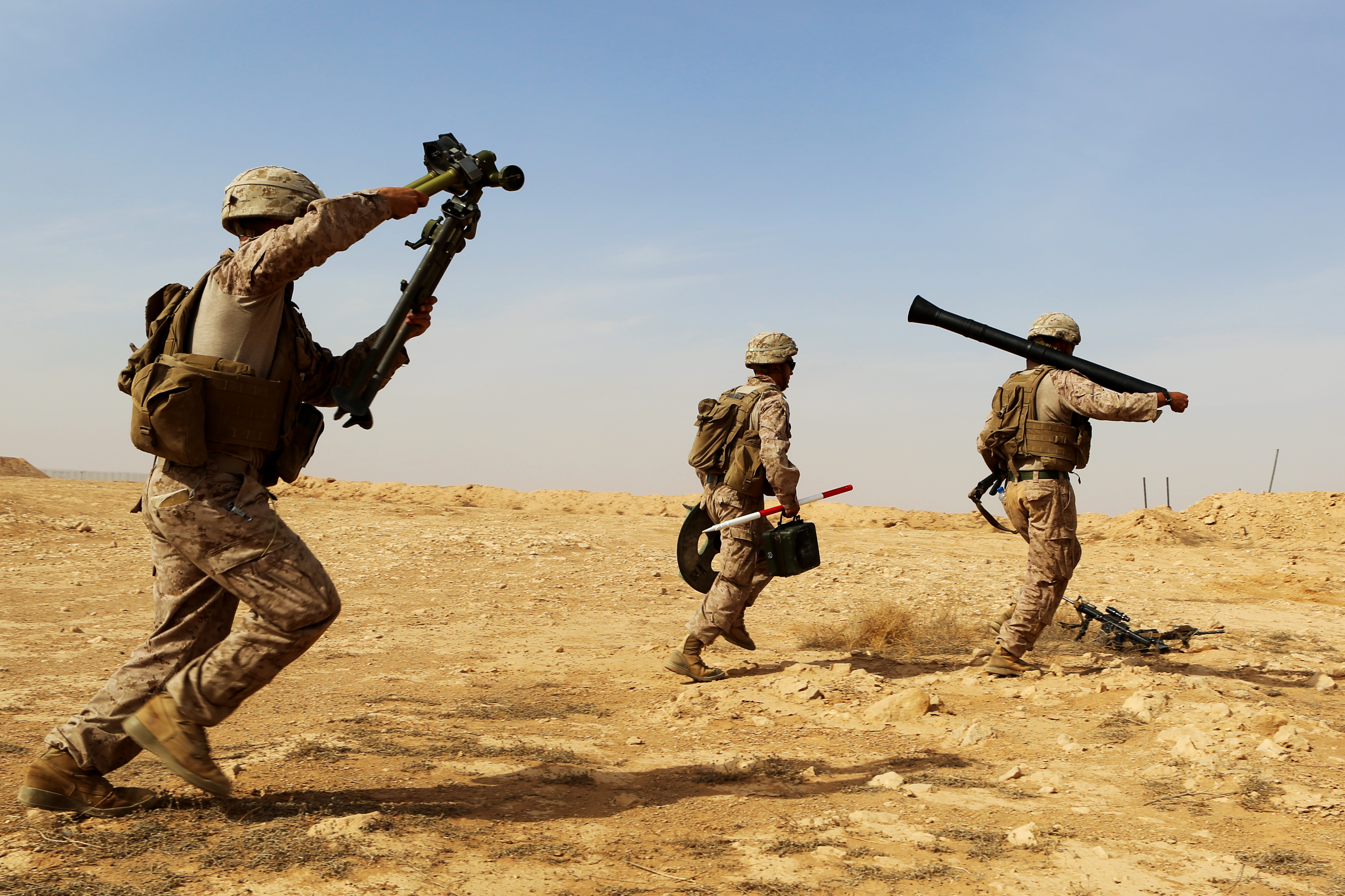
Mortar team carrying (L-R) the mount, the baseplate and sight, and the cannon for an M252A2 system

The M252 system weighs 91 lb (41 kg) completely assembled and is composed of the M253 Cannon (35 lb (16 kg)), M177 Mount (27 lb (12 kg)), M3A1 Baseplate (29 lb (13 kg)), and the M64A1 Sight Unit (2.5 lb (1.1 kg)). The mount consists of a base plate and a bipod, which is provided with screw type elevating and traversing mechanisms to elevate/traverse the mortar. The M64A1 sight unit (also used on the M224) is attached to the bipod mount. The M252 is a gravity-fired smoothbore system. Attached to the muzzle of the weapon is the Blast Attenuation Device (BAD), used to reduce the blast effects on the mortar crew. To increase cooling efficiency, the breech end is finned; though first-hand accounts attest that the level of cooling is negligible. The cannon also has a crew-removable breech plug and firing pin.

High explosive rounds fired by the M252 weigh 10 lb (4.5 kg) with 0.7 kg of explosive filler and can have an effective kill radius of 115 ft (35 m).

In 2017, the Marines revealed they were developing precision-guided rounds for the 81 mm mortar, similar to efforts for the 120 mm Expeditionary Fire Support System but in a man-portable system.

== History ==
The M252 is an adaptation of the British 81mm L16A2 mortar developed in the 1950s. It entered service with the U.S. Army and replaced the previous 81 mm M29 mortar in 1987. It was adopted due to the extended range (4,500 to 5,650 m (4,920 to 6,180 yd)) and enhanced lethality. In the U.S. it is produced by Watervliet Arsenal.

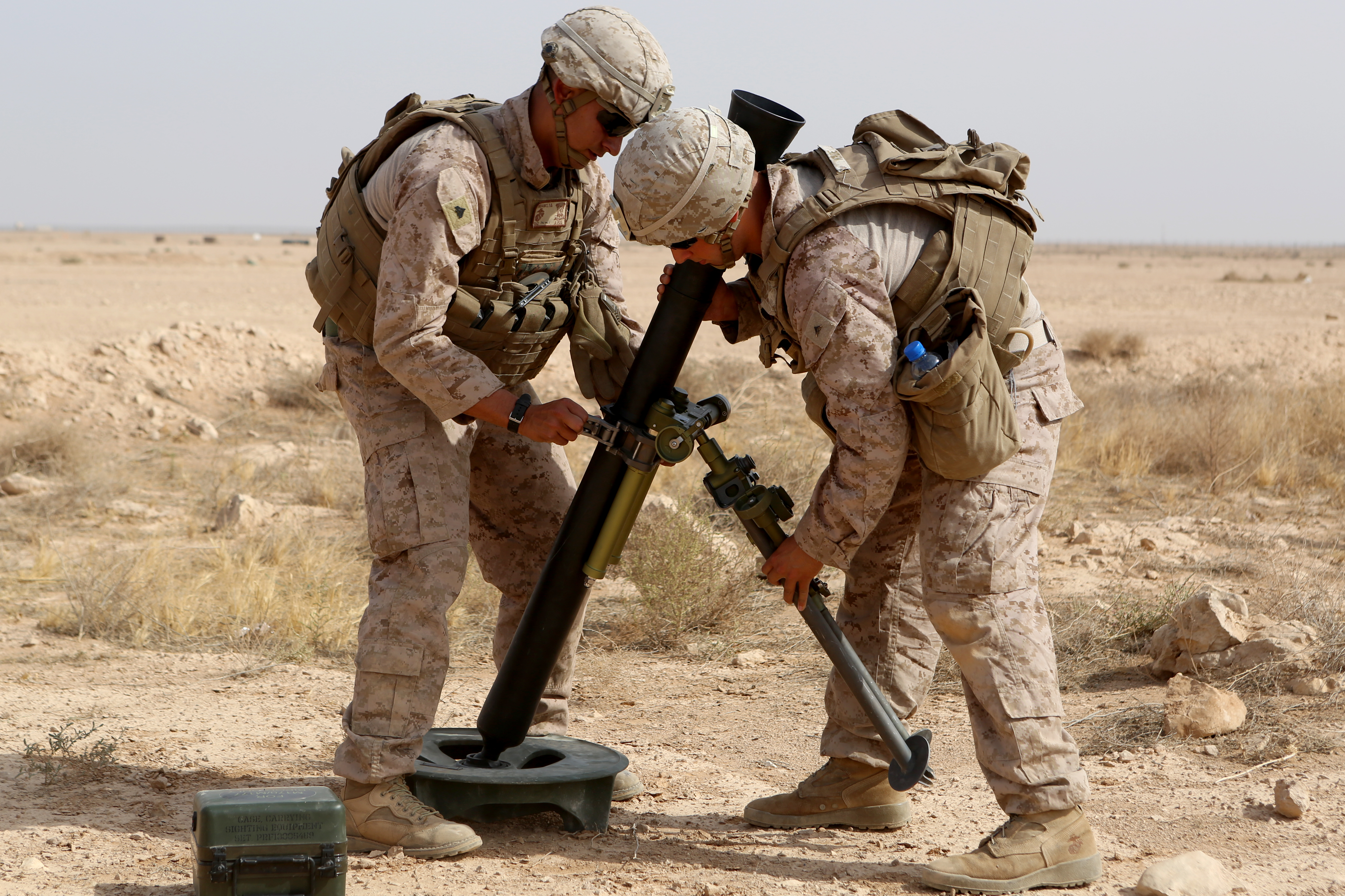
Lighter, M252A2 version

A lightweight version, the M252A1 was first fielded in December 2014. By using lightweight materials such as aluminum, titanium and nylon kevlar the total weight was reduced by 12 pounds (5.4 kg) to 79 pounds (36 kg). The M252A1 also required less maintenance with its grease-less internal gears. The M252A1 was scheduled to replace the M252 in 2016. In November 2016, the Watervliet Arsenal received a contract to produce the bipods which have an A-shaped bipod frame with deliveries to be completed by March 2020. As part of the same program, a lightweight version of the M224 60mm mortar the M224A1 was also developed. The Marines developed an improved M252A2 version that weighs about 8.16 kg (18.0 lb) less than the original and incorporates a 4× magnification sight with a new cooling system.

== Operation ==
=== Crew ===
A crew of five enlisted personnel operate the M252: the squad leader, the gunner, the assistant gunner, the first ammunition bearer, and the second ammunition bearer.

1. The squad leader stands directly behind the mortar where they can command and control their squad. In addition to having general oversight of all squad activities, they also supervise the emplacement, laying, and firing of the weapon.
2. The gunner stands to the left of the mortar where they can manipulate the sight, traversing handwheel, and elevating handwheel. They place firing data on the sight and lays the mortar for deflection and elevation. They make large deflection shifts by shifting the bipod assembly and keep the bubbles level during firing.
3. The assistant gunner stands to the right of the mortar, facing the barrel and ready to load. In addition to loading, they swab the bore after 10 rounds have been fired or after each fire mission. The assistant gunner is the person who actually fires the weapon.
4. The first ammunition bearer stands to the right rear of the mortar. They have the duty of preparing the ammunition (charge settings, fuzes, etc...) and passing it to the assistant gunner.
5. The second ammunition bearer stands to the right rear of the mortar behind the first ammunition bearer. They maintain and keep a record of the ammunition in addition to the data corresponding to each fire mission. Their twofold records include a written table of firing data, type, and number of rounds fired, and the safety pins pulled from each round to provide physical evidence to the accuracy of the table. In addition they provide local security for the mortar position.
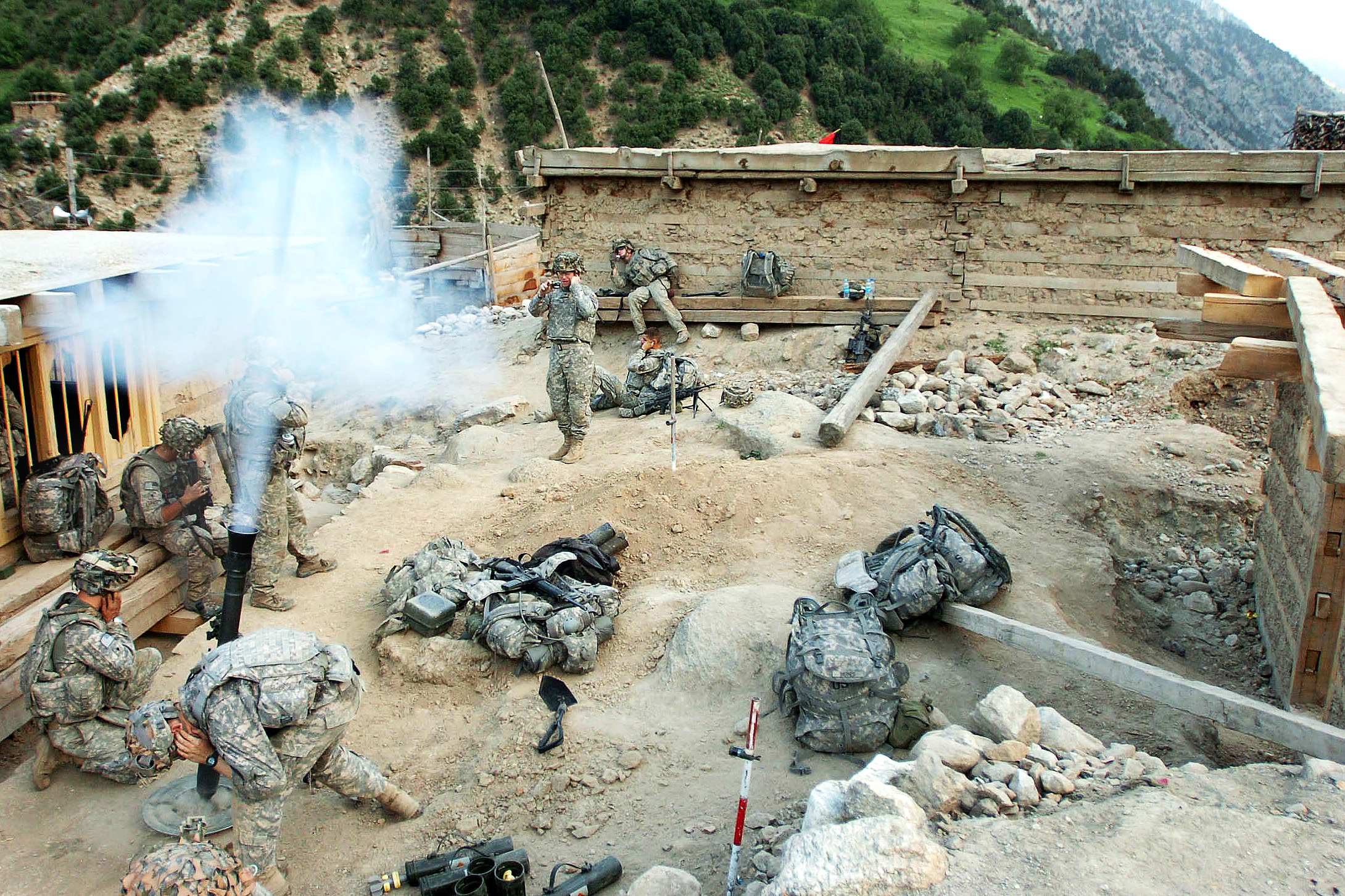
M252 mortar and crew in Afghanistan, 2009

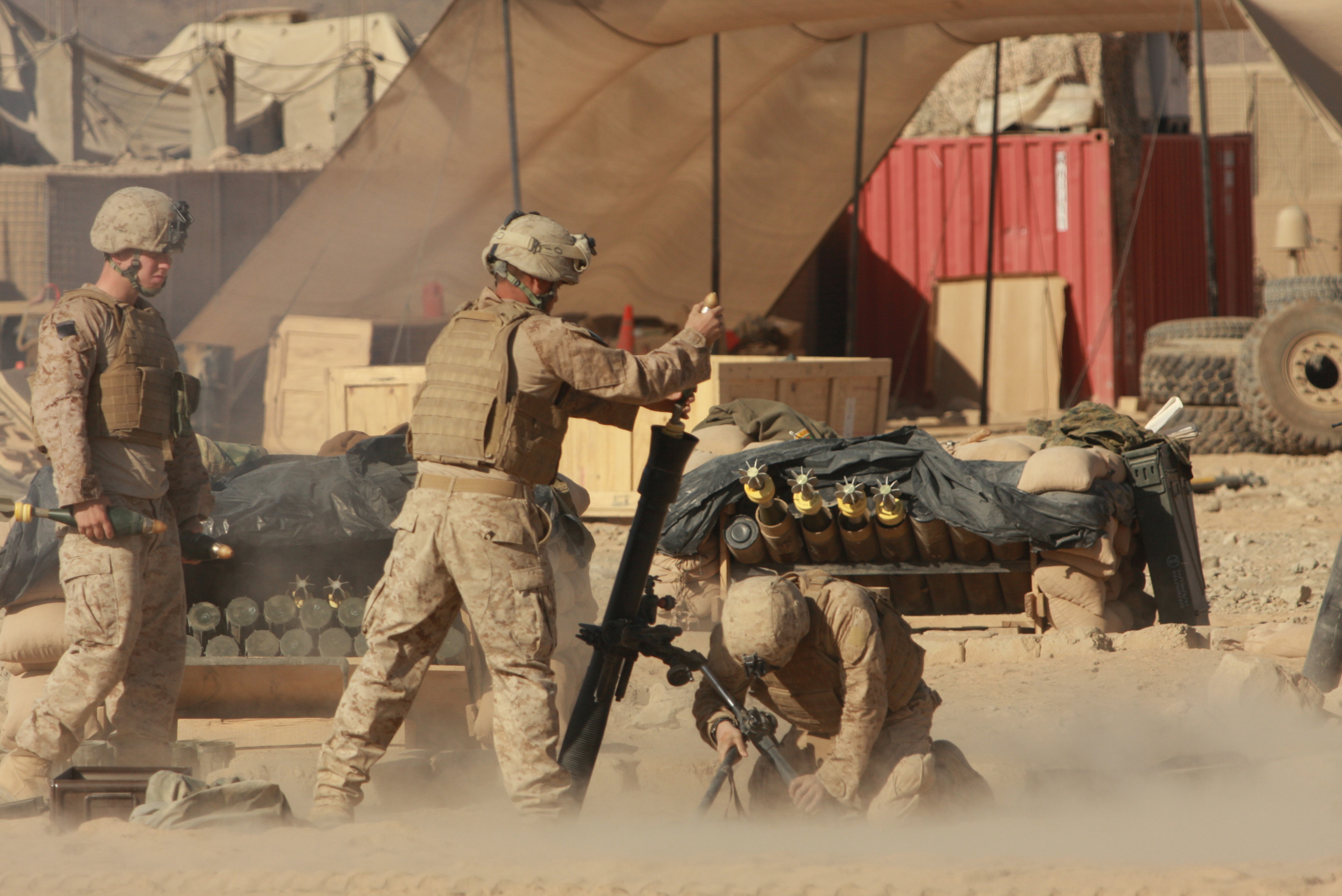
M252 mortar crew and ammunition in Afghanistan, 2008

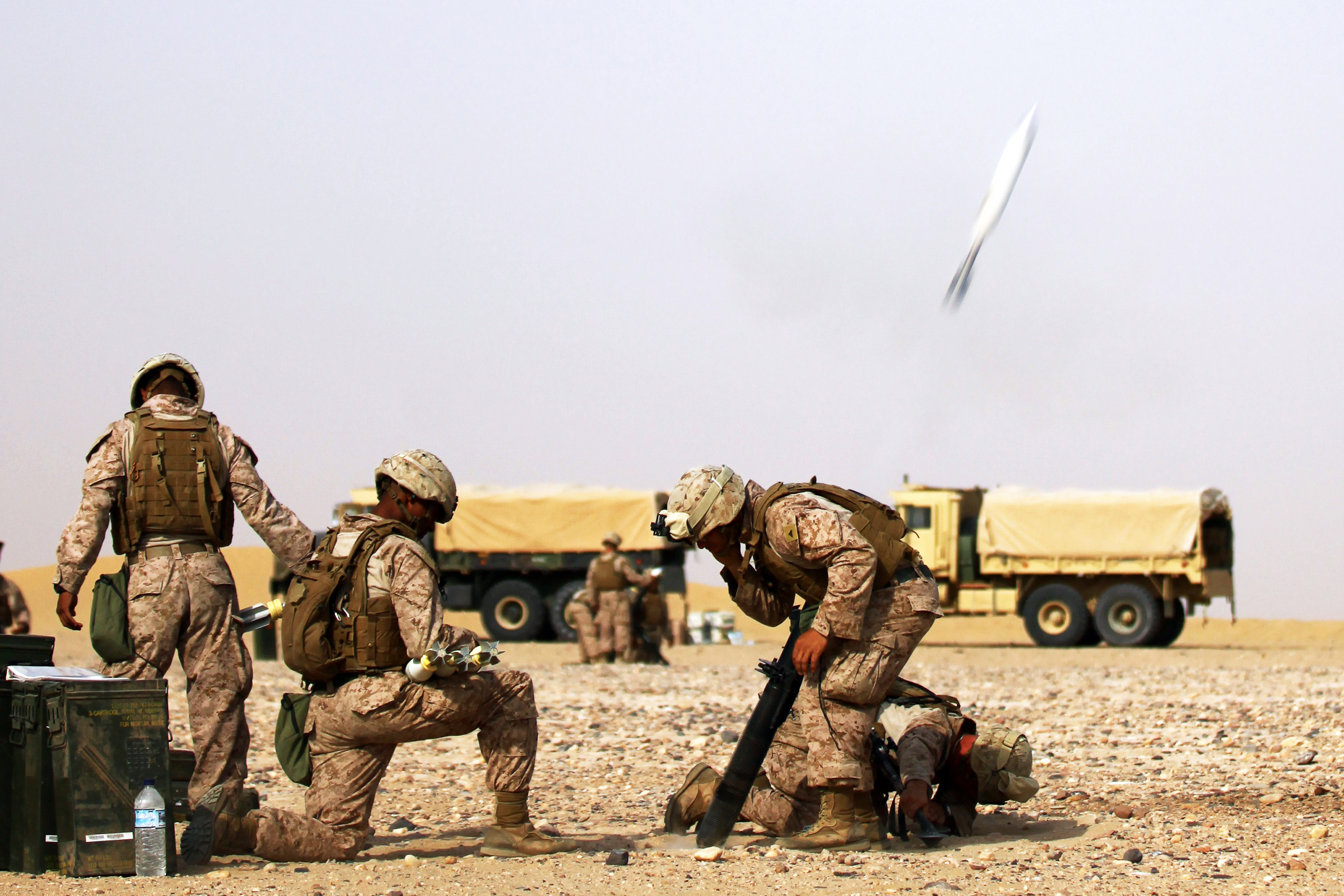
Marines fire an M-252 81mm mortar during live-fire training at Udairi Range in Kuwait, 2012

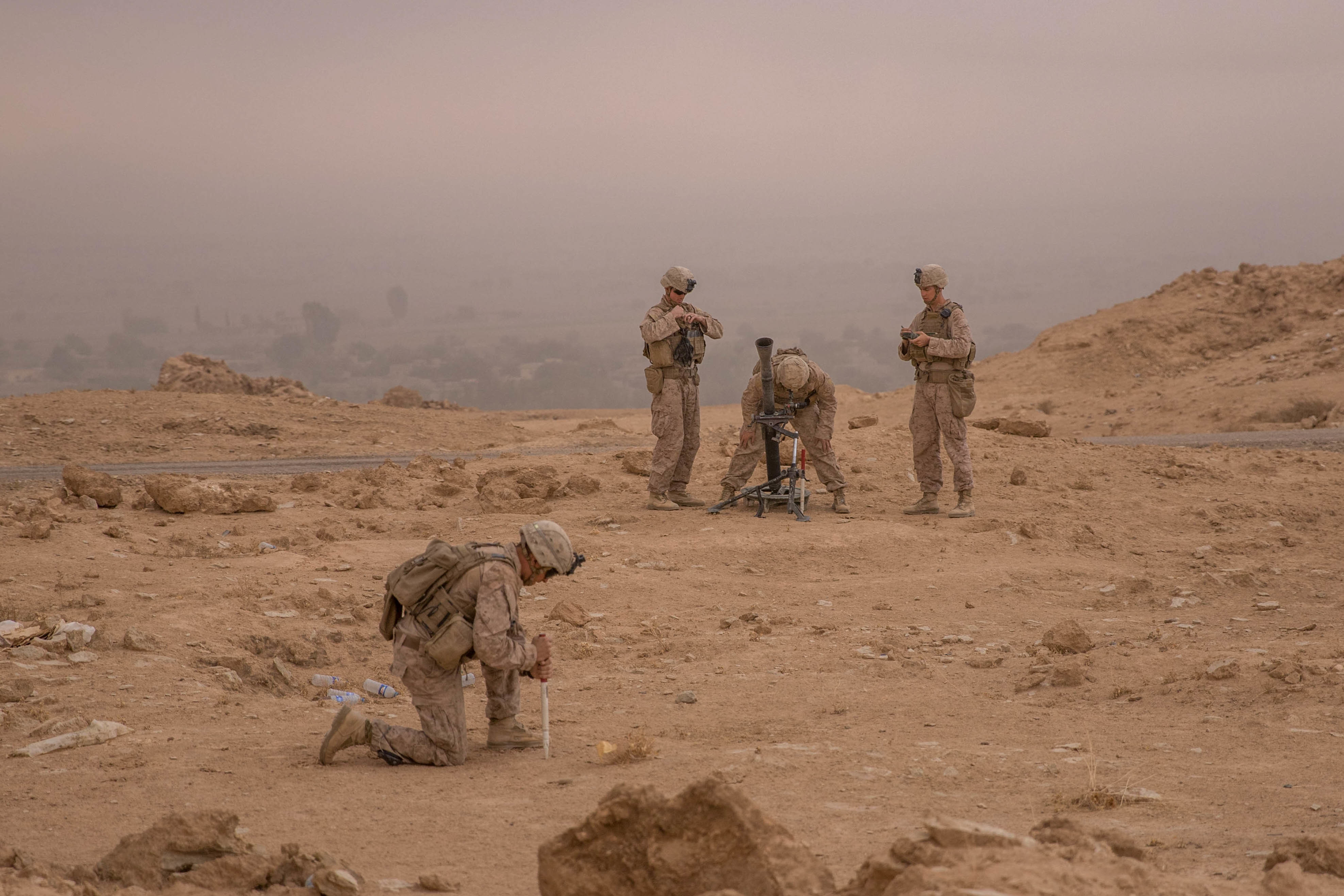
Marine M252 mortar crew deploying on a cliff-side in the Middle Euphrates River Valley in Syria, 11 October 2018

=== Types of rounds ===
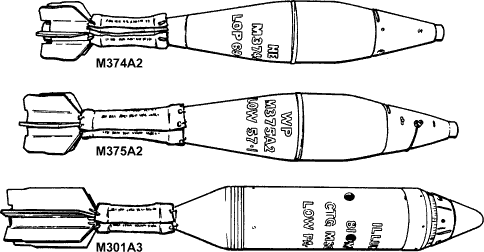
Three 81mm M29 Mortar rounds, M374A2 (High Explosive), M375A2 (White Phosphorus), and M301A3 (Illumination).

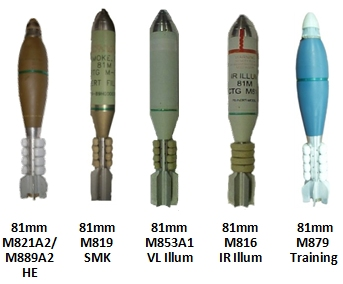
81mm ammunition for M252

While the M252 does fire a weapon-specific series of ammunition, it can also fire rounds from the M29 Mortar (only at charge 3 or below though). The M252 Mortar can fire the following principal classifications of training and service ammunition:

- High explosive (HE): Designations M821, M821A1, M889, M889A1, M372-series, and M362. Used against personnel and light materiel targets.
  - M821A4 HE–Enhanced Fragmentation (HE–EF): is designed to satisfy insensitive munition requirements while enhancing lethality, which is achieved by utilizing preformed tungsten fragments.
  - Advanced Capability Extended Range Mortar (ACERM): Developmental guided round that adds wings, control fins, GPS navigation, a laser seeker, and an enhanced warhead; increases accuracy to within one meter and can reach a range of 20 km (12 mi) in five minutes. ACERM variations include a 120mm version with 24 to 33 km (15 to 21 mi) range, an 81mm extreme performance configuration with a 40 to 60 km (25 to 37 mi) range, a 5 inch naval gun configuration, including other gun systems, and an air dropped glide bomb version for delivery within a six times the altitude radius.
- Smoke Cartridge: Designations M819 and M375-series. Used as a screening, signaling, or marking munition.
- Illumination (ILLUM)
  - VIS ILLUM. Designations M853A1 and M301-series. Used in night missions requiring illumination for assistance in observation.
  - IR ILLUM. Designation M816. Provides an aerial parachuting Infrared Illuminating round for use with Infrared Night Vision Equipment.
  - Non-Lethal Indirect Fire Munition: Developmental round based on the M853A1 that disperses flash bang submunitions to temporarily daze people.
- Practice (PRAC): Designations M880, M879, M68, and sabot. Used for training in limited areas.
- Infrared Illumination (IR): Produces illumination which is only visible through the use of night vision devices.

=== Fuzes ===
The M252 rounds have three fuze types: the Multi-option Fuze (MOF) M734, the Mechanical Time & Super Quick (MTSQ) M772 and the Point-Detonating (PD) Fuze M935. The M734 is used for the M720 HE round and can be set to function as proximity burst, near-surface burst, impact burst, or delay burst, the M772 is used for the IR & VIS ILLUM (M816, M853A1) to activate the Illum candle during the rounds height point of its trajectory; the elevation and charge will determine the time set on the fuze.

=== Method of propulsion ===
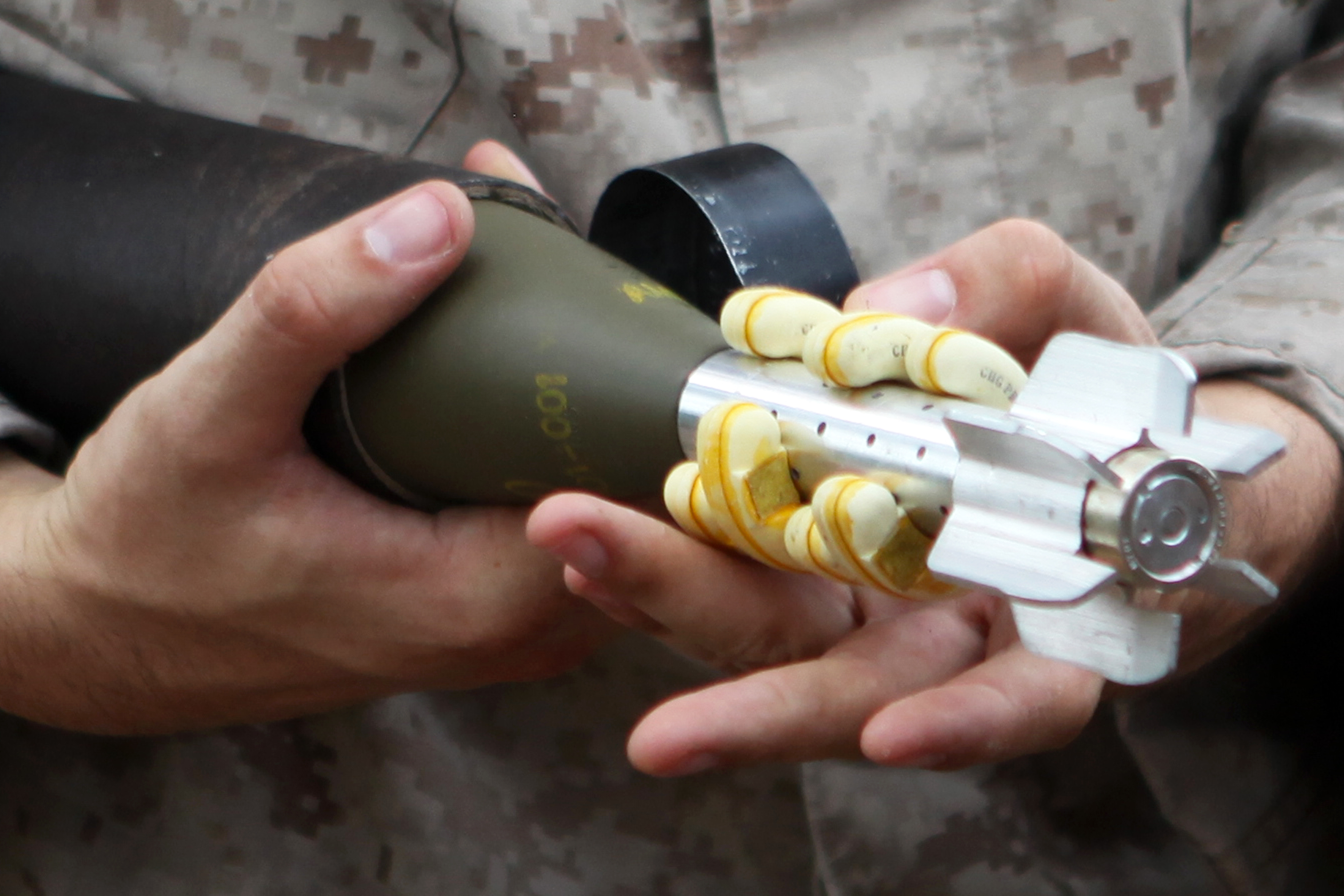
Round with the standard four horseshoe charges

The range of a mortar is controlled by the number of propellant charges attached to the tail of the mortar designated M223. A charge is a semi-circular donut of nitrocellulose, which resembles a "horseshoe". A round for the M252 mortar comes with four charges attached. Longer-range shots require more propellant than can fit in the tail of the round, hence the necessity of external charges.

When the target is ranged, a mortar team member adjusts the amount of propellant by removing horseshoe charges from the projectile. The mortar squad leader verifies the number of charges; then the assistant gunner drops the round down the muzzle of the tube. The round, pulled by gravity, accelerates down the smooth bore of the mortar until the primer (in the base of the tail boom of the round) strikes the firing pin located in the bottom of the mortar tail assembly. The primer detonates, igniting the charge in the tail fin, which in turn ignites the horseshoes charges on the round. The charges deflagrate, releasing hot, expanding gas which pushes against the round with the obturating ring on the projectile, sealing the gas behind the projectile. The pressure from the expanding gas accelerates the projectile until it leaves the end of the tube.

== Operators ==
=== Current operators ===
- Australia: M252A1
- Denmark
- Estonia
- Iraq
  - Iraqi Kurdistan: Peshmerga
- Jordan
- United States
  - United States Army 990 M252 as of January 2025
  - United States Marine Corps

== See also ==
- Artillery
- Military technology and equipment
- List of artillery
- List of crew served weapons of the US Armed Forces
- L16 81mm Mortar (original designation)

Ken Pender's The Republic 2010 pilot for Hollywood.
