= M224 mortar =

U.S.-developed artillery weapon

M224
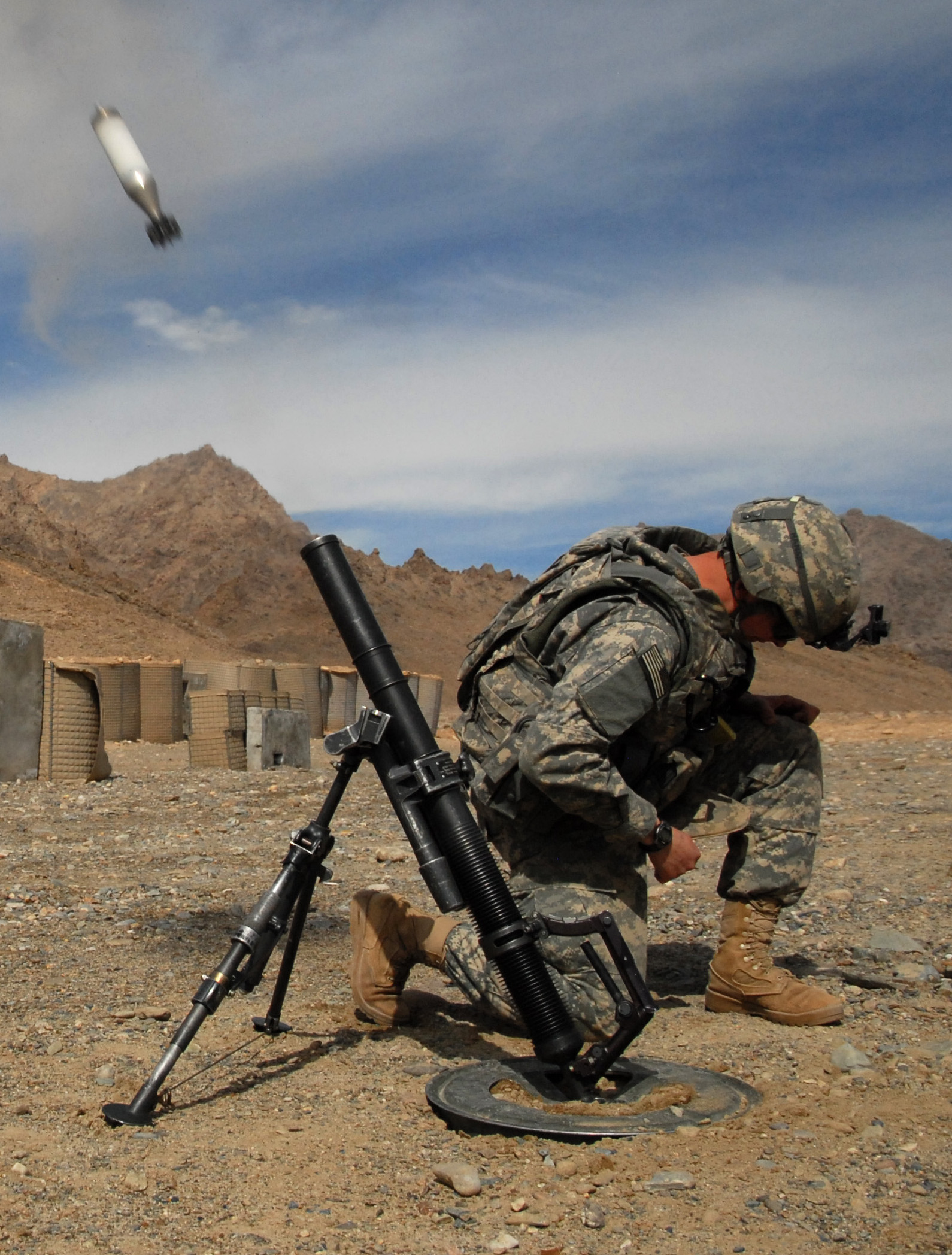
- Type: Mortar
- Place of origin: United States

Service history
- In service: 1978–present
- Used by: See operators
- Wars: Vietnam War (prototype model); Lebanese Civil War; Gulf War; War in Afghanistan (2001-2021); Iraq War; War in Iraq (2013-2017); Russo-Ukrainian War

Production history
- Unit cost: $10,658
- Variants: M224; M224A1

Specifications
- Mass: 21.1 kilograms (47 lb)
- Barrel length: 1 meter (3.3 feet)
- Crew: 3
- Caliber: 60 mm (2.4 in)
- Rate of fire: up to 20 rpm sustained, 30 rpm in exceptional circumstances and for short periods
- Effective firing range: HE: 70–3,490 m (76–3,816 yds)
- Feed system: manual

The M224 60 mm Lightweight Company Mortar System (LWCMS) is a smoothbore, muzzle-loading, high-angle-of-fire mortar used for close-in support of ground troops. It was deployed extensively in the War in Afghanistan by the United States military.

== Description ==
The M224 system is composed of these parts:

- M225 Cannon: 14.4 lb (6.5 kg)
- M170 Bipod: 15.2 lb (6.9 kg)
- M7A1 Baseplate for use in conventional mode: 9.6 lb (4.4 kg) or
  - M8 baseplate for use in handheld mode: 3.6 lb (1.6 kg)
- M64A1 Sight Unit (The M67 Sight Unit is now widely used for the system): 2.5 lb (1.1 kg)

The mount consists of a bipod and a base plate, which is provided with screw-type elevating and traversing mechanisms to elevate/traverse the mortar. The M64A1 sight unit is attached to the bipod mount. The mortar can be fired in the conventional mode or the handheld mode. This smoothbore system can be gravity-fired or fired by using a manual spring-loaded trigger.

It is typically fielded at the infantry company level. A small mortar section with two mortars was organic to Army rifle companies (light, airborne, air assault) and Ranger companies. Marine rifle companies have a section with three 60 mm mortars in the company weapons platoon.

== History ==
The M224 LWCMS (Lightweight Company Mortar System) replaced the older (WWII-era) 60 mm M2 mortar and the inaccurate M19 Mortar and began fielding as prototypes in the mid-1970s during the Vietnam War. The M2s and M19s had an effective range of only 2,000 m (2,187 yd). While the M224s were designed to fire all types of the older ammunition, their primary rounds are of the newer, longer-range type that range out to 3,489 m (3,816 yd).

In 2011, an improved M224A1 version was brought into service. The M224A1 consists of the M225A1 tube, M170A1 bipod assembly, M7A1 baseplate, M8 auxiliary baseplate and the M64A1 sight unit. By reducing the number of components and using lighter materials, the M224A1 mortar system weighs at about 37.5 lbs (17 kg), which is 20% less with a reduction of 9.3 lb (4 kg) compared to the original M224. The US Army plans to replace all legacy M224s with the new M224A1. Concurrently, a lighter version of the 81 mm M252 mortar was also developed.

== Ammunition ==
The M224 Mortar can fire the following principal classifications of training and service ammunition:

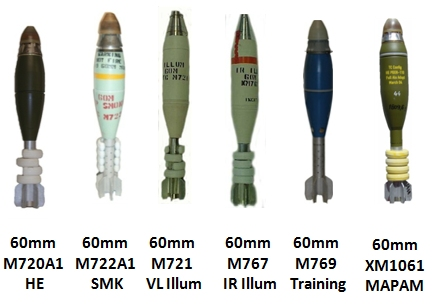
60mm ammunition for M224

- High explosive (HE): Designations M888, M720, and M720A1. Used against personnel and light material targets. The M888 HE shell has 0.79 lb (0.36 kg) of Composition B explosive filler.
  - M1061 Enhanced Lethality Cartridge: Improved HE with an enhanced fragmentation warhead and insensitive munition characteristics. Its increased lethality is accomplished with a matrix of pre-formed fragments and 0.56 lb (0.25 kg) of PBXN-110 explosive. As a result, the M1061 achieves lethality near that of an 81 mm mortar HE round.
- Smoke Cartridge (WP): Designation M722. Used as a screening, signaling, or marking munition.
- Illumination (ILLUM): Used in night missions requiring illumination for assistance in observation.
- Training practice (TP): Designation M50A2/A3. Used for training in limited areas. These rounds are obsolete and no longer used.
- Red Phosphorus: Can not be fired by the 60 mm mortar
- Full Range Practice Cartridges (FRPC): Designation M769. This round is used for practice or clearing misfires.

=== Fuzes ===
The M224 rounds have three fuze types: The Multioption Fuze (M734), the Point-Detonating Fuze (M525), and Timer fuze. The M734 is used for the M720 HE round and can be set to function as proximity burst, near-surface burst, impact burst, or delay burst.

== Operators ==
- Australia used by 2nd Battalion, Royal Australian Regiment – ( Amphibious Infantry)
- Iraq
- Ukraine
- United States

== Gallery ==
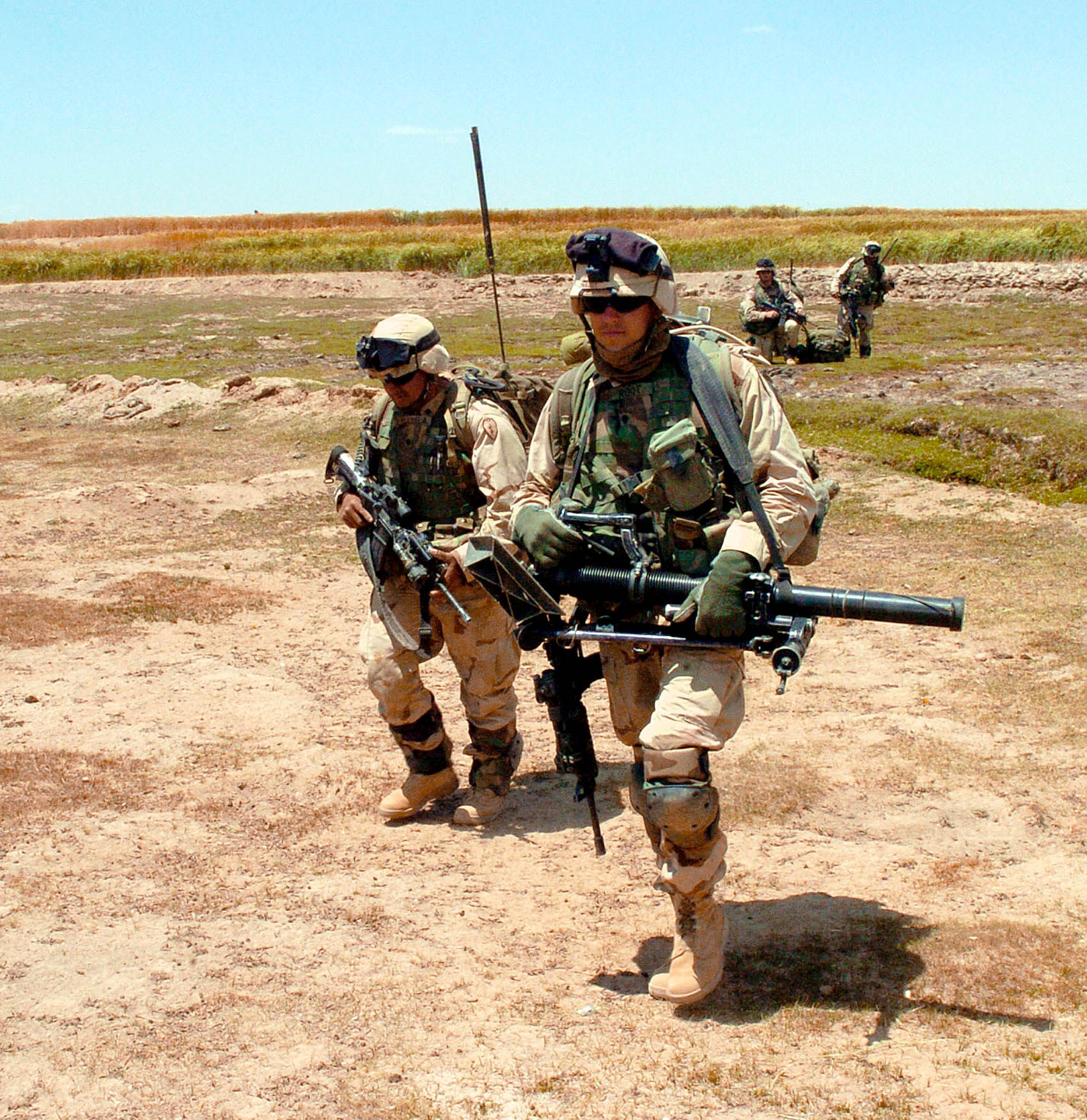
Army mortarman in Afghanistan, 2004. Conventional mode.

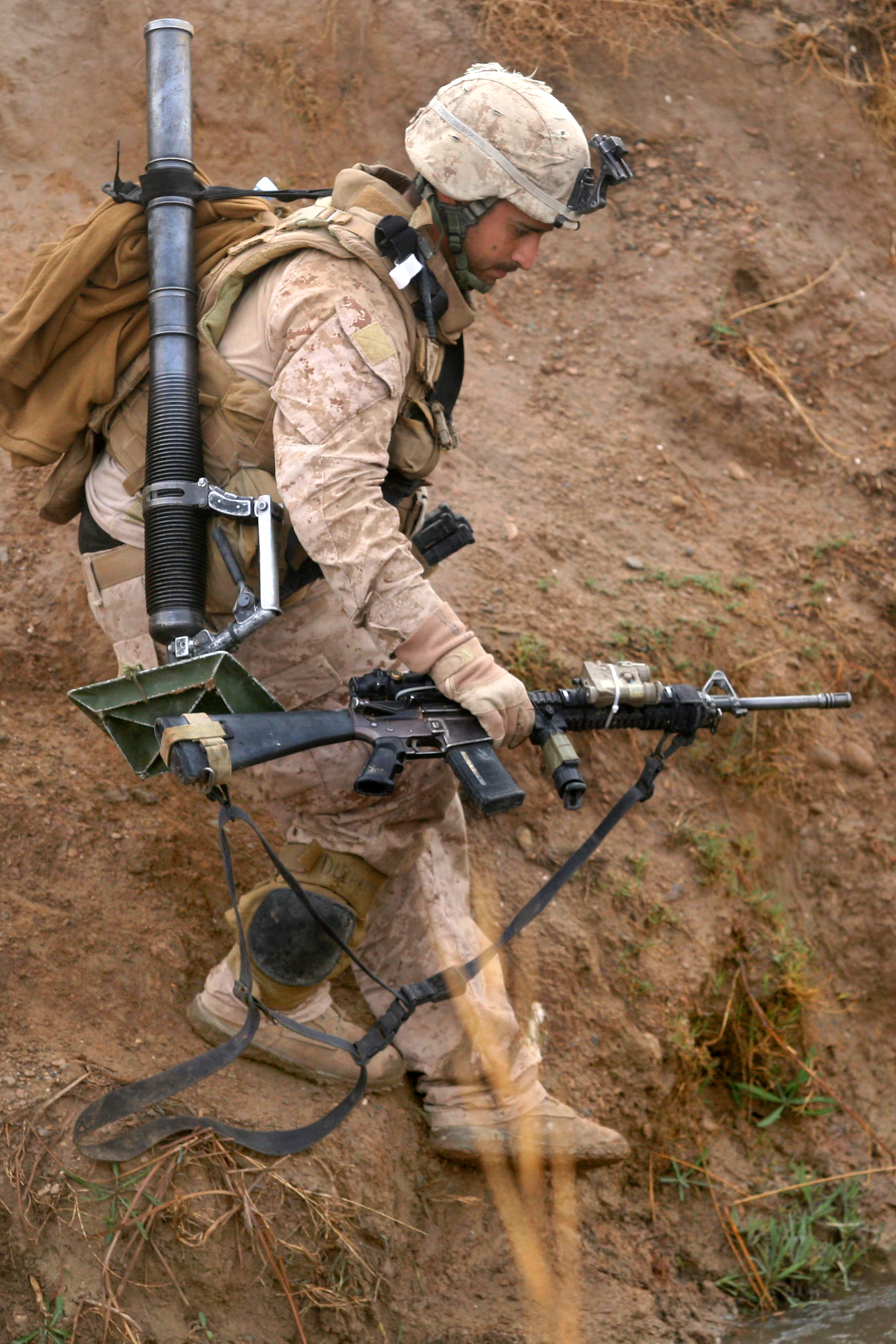
Marine mortarman in Afghanistan, 2010. Handheld mode.

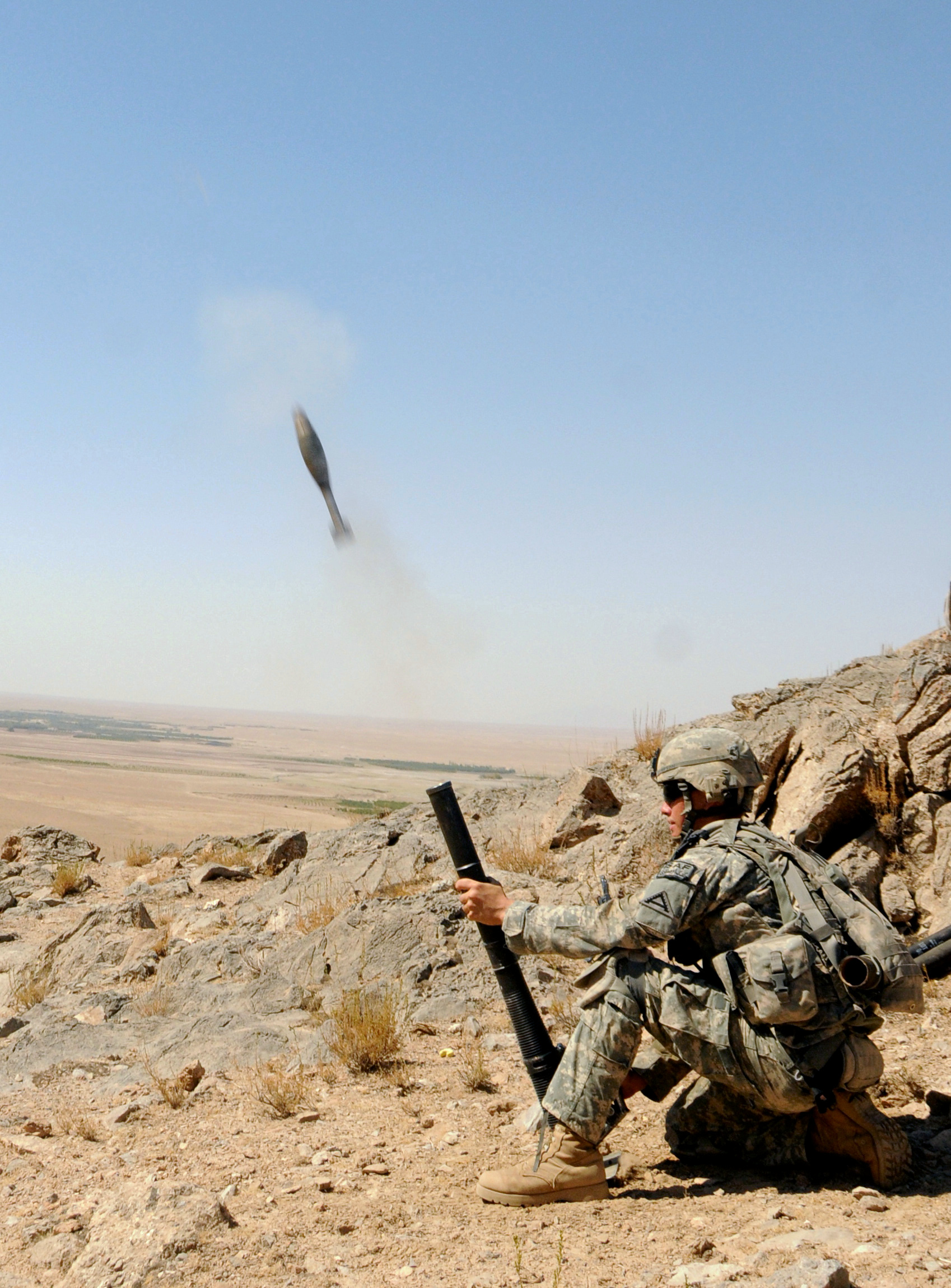
Handheld configuration in Afghanistan, 2010.

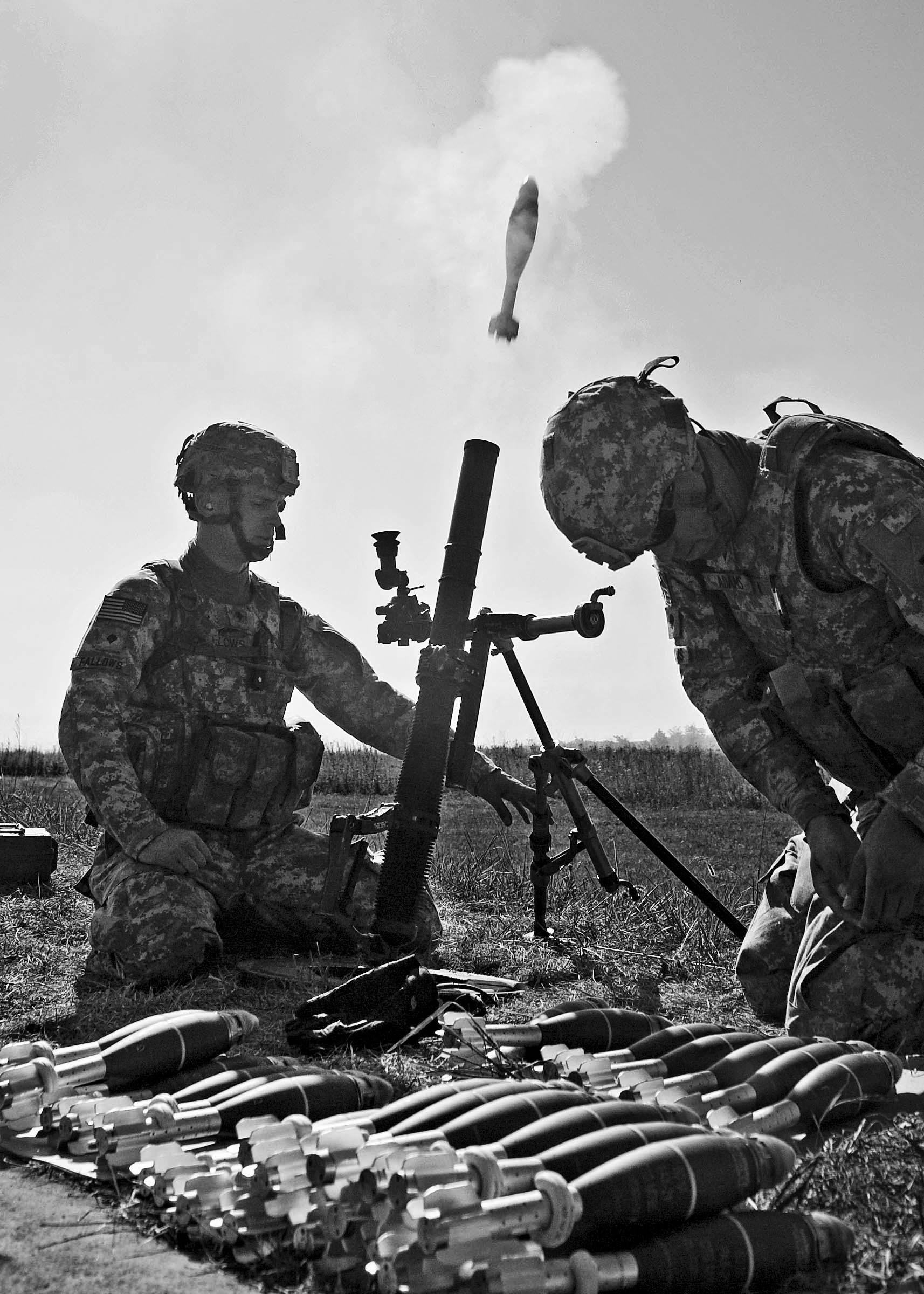
Massachusetts Mortar Platoon with M224 mortar Fires for Effect at Camp Atterbury.

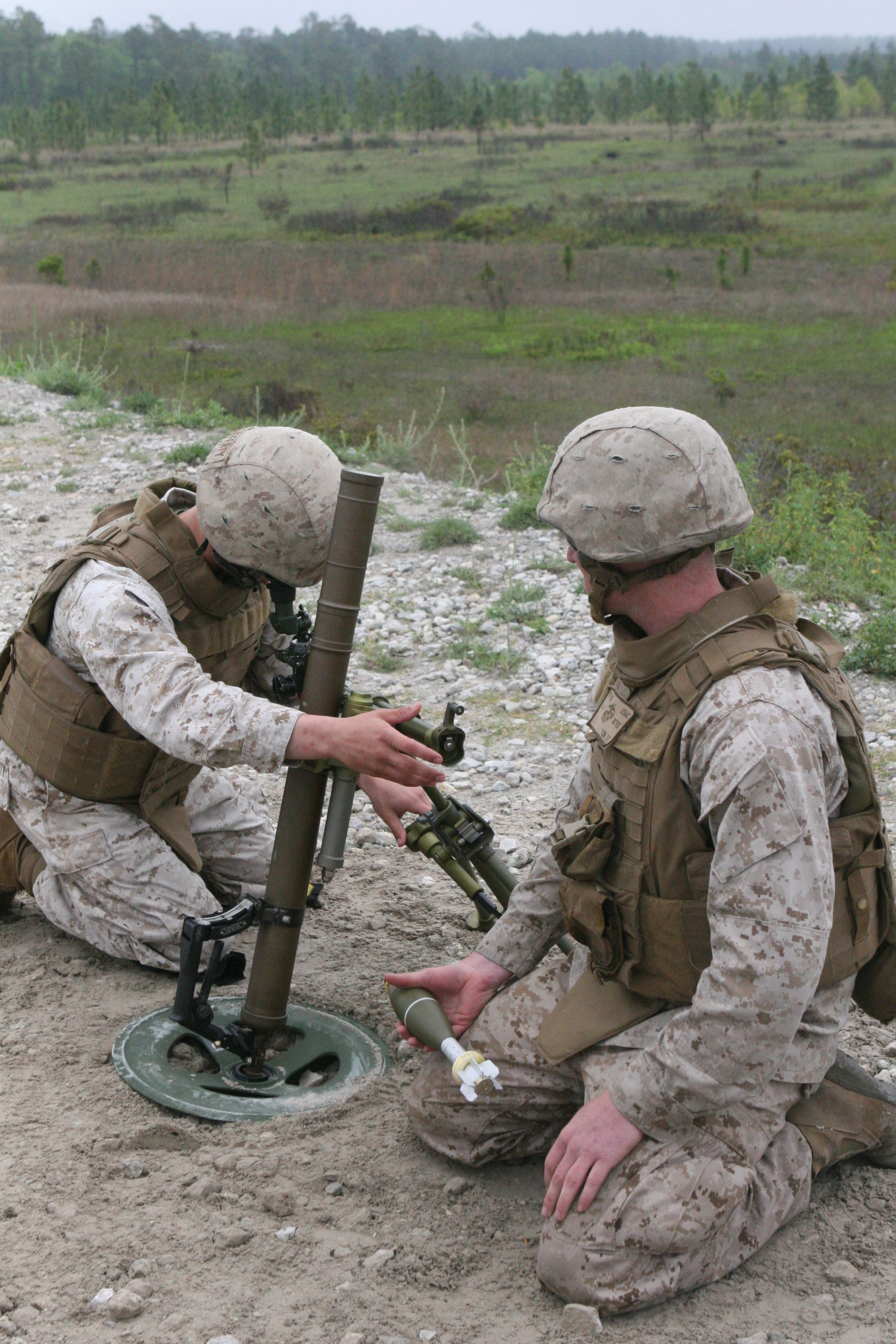
M224A1.

M224A1 mortarman in Yakima Training Center, 2013.

== See also ==
- General articles:
  - Artillery
  - Military technology and equipment
  - Mortar (weapon)
- Similar weapons:
  - M252 mortar – (United Kingdom)
  - M6 mortar – (Austria)
- Listings:
  - List of artillery
  - List of crew-served weapons of the U.S. Armed Forces
