= M19 mortar =

US M19 60 mm Mortar
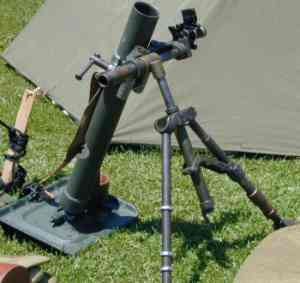
- Type: Infantry mortar
- Place of origin: United States

Service history
- Used by: See Users
- Wars: Korean War; Vietnam War; Laotian Civil War; Cambodian Civil War; Salvadoran Civil War

Production history
- Manufacturer: Watervliet Arsenal

Specifications
- Mass: 23.4 kilograms (52 lb) (M5 mount); 9.3 kilograms (21 lb) (M1 mount)
- Length: 81.9 cm (2 ft 8.2 in)
- Barrel length: 72.6 cm (2 ft 4.6 in)
- Shell weight: 1.36 kg (3 lb 0 oz)
- Caliber: 60 mm (2.4 in)
- Elevation: +40° to +85° on M5 mount free on M1 mount
- Traverse: 14° on M5 mount free on M1 mount
- Muzzle velocity: 89 m/s (290 ft/s)
- Effective firing range: 68 m (74 yd)
- Maximum firing range: 747 m (817 yd)
- Feed system: manual

The M19 mortar is a light, smoothbore, muzzle-loading, high-angle-of-fire weapon for light infantry support developed and produced in the United States. It has been replaced in service by the more modern 60 mm M224 mortar, which has a much longer range and improved ammunition.

== History and description ==
The development of the M19 began in 1942 as the T18E6, a light weapon weighing only 19.5 pounds (8.8 kg) and intended to be man-carried troops in rough terrain and quickly brought into action against enemy positions. The primary differences between the M2 and T18E6 was that the M2 was drop-fire only (the bomb being fired by a fixed firing pin at the base of the tube), while the T18E6 could be either drop-fired or a round loaded into the barrel and then fired by a lever-like trigger at the base of the tube. In addition, the original T18E6 only had a simple spade-like M1 baseplate, leaving the elevation and traverse free for the firer like the Japanese Type 89 grenade discharger or British Two-inch mortar.

The method of free aiming was found to be too inaccurate, and the Infantry Board initially refused the T18E6. The M5 bipod for the M2 mortar, which had a conventional baseplate and bipod with elevation and traverse adjustment and a sight, was then fitted. This gave the T18E6 better accuracy, but made it heavier than the M2 Mortar. The T18E6 began serial production in January 1944. The first T18E6 mortars were delivered in summer 1944, and saw action late in World War II. A 7th Infantry Division operations report from the Battle of Leyte stated that "During this operation, the 60mm Mortar with T18E6 tube and M2 base plate, bipod, and sight, were employed. This weapon has not proved as efficient as the M2 Mortar, since it is less accurate." Conversely, War Department observers in early 1944 found that after demonstrations of the weapon in the European and Mediterranean Theaters, "The lightness and versatility of the new 60-mm mortar firing mechanism and baseplate were appreciated, and this mortar is preferred to the present standard weapon." Postwar, the T18E6 was standardized as the M19, and saw action during the Korean War and Vietnam War alongside the M2 before being replaced by the M224 mortar in the late 1970s.

== Users ==
- Belgium – produced under license
- Cambodia
- Canada – produced under license
- Chile
- Colombia
- El Salvador
- Ethiopia
- Greece mostly SF used by Infantry on smaller islands too
- Iran
- Japan – Japan Ground Self-Defense Force used it.
- Lithuania
- Luxembourg
- Mexico
- Myanmar
- Panama
- Philippines
- South Korea: The Armed Forces was equipped with 579 M2/M19s before the Korean War, and 2,263 were in service with the Army by the end of the war. Replaced with KM19 in 1970s.
- Thailand
- Turkey
- United States
- South Vietnam
- Vietnam
