= L16 81mm mortar =

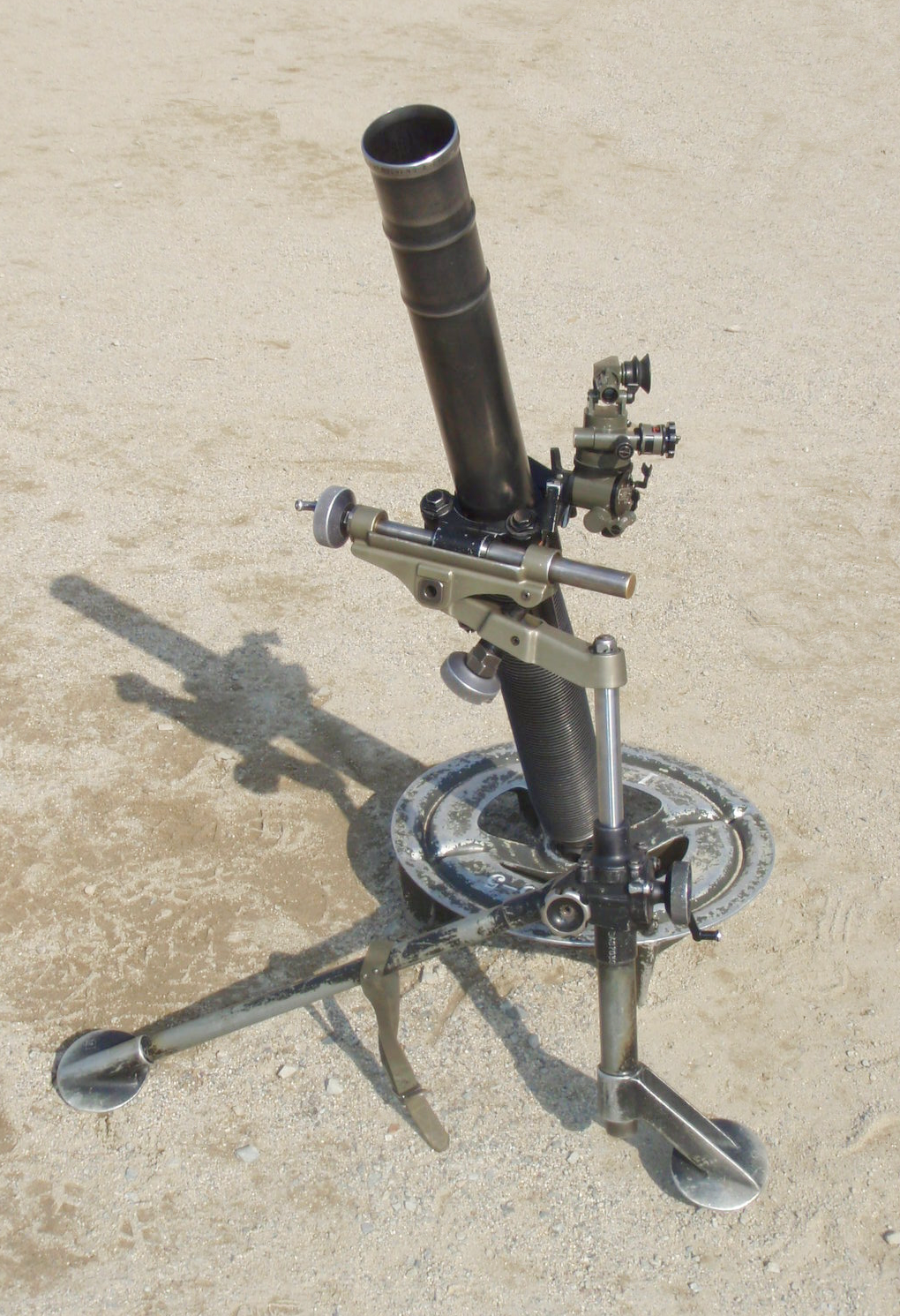
- 81mm mortar L16
- Type: Mortar
- Place of origin: United Kingdom; Canada

Service history
- Used by: See Users
- Wars: Rhodesian Bush War; Lebanese Civil War; Nepalese civil war; Borneo, South Arabia, Oman; Vietnam War; Falklands War; Indo-Pakistani War of 1971; Balkans, Kuwait, Iraq, Afghanistan, Mali.; Syrian Civil War

Production history
- Designer: Royal Armament Research and Development Establishment, Fort Halstead (barrel and bipod)
- Designed: 1956
- Manufacturer: Royal Ordnance (barrel and bipod)
- Produced: 1965

Specifications
- Mass: 35.3 kg (78 lb)
- Barrel length: 1,280 millimetres (50 in)
- Crew: 3
- Shell weight: 4.2 kilograms (9.3 lb) (L3682).
- Calibre: 81 millimetres (3.2 in)
- Action: muzzle loading
- Breech: none
- Recoil: baseplate and spring buffered mounting clamp
- Rate of fire: 15 rpm, 1–12 rpm sustained, 20 rpm for short periods
- Muzzle velocity: 225 m/s (740 ft/s)
- Effective firing range: HE: 100–5,675 m (109–6,206 yd); Smoke: 100–5,675 m (109–6,206 yd); Illumination: 400–4,800 m (437–5,249 yd)
- Maximum firing range: 5,650 m (6,180 yd)
- Feed system: Manual
- Sights: Optical (C2) with Trilux illumination

The L16 81mm mortar is a British and Canadian standard mortar used by the Canadian Army, British Army, and many other armed forces. It originated as a joint design by the UK and Canada. The U.S. armed forces version is the M252.

== Description ==
It was introduced in 1965–66, replacing the Ordnance ML 3 inch Mortar in UK service, where it is used by the British Army, the Royal Marines and the RAF Regiment.

In UK armoured/mechanised infantry battalions, the L16 mortar is mounted in an FV 432 AFV (six per battalion mortar platoon). British army light role infantry battalions and the Royal Marines may transport their mortars in BvS 10 vehicles (the replacement for the Bv 206). Otherwise, it is carried disassembled in three loads, (barrel, baseplate and bipod with sights, each approximately 11 kg), normally carried by a vehicle or helicopter and assembled for firing from the ground.

The weapon can be man-packed by the mortar detachment, in which case the ammunition would be carried by other soldiers of the battalion. In addition to their normal equipment, each soldier would carry four bombs in a pair of two-bomb plastic containers (known as greenies in the British Army).

== Operators ==
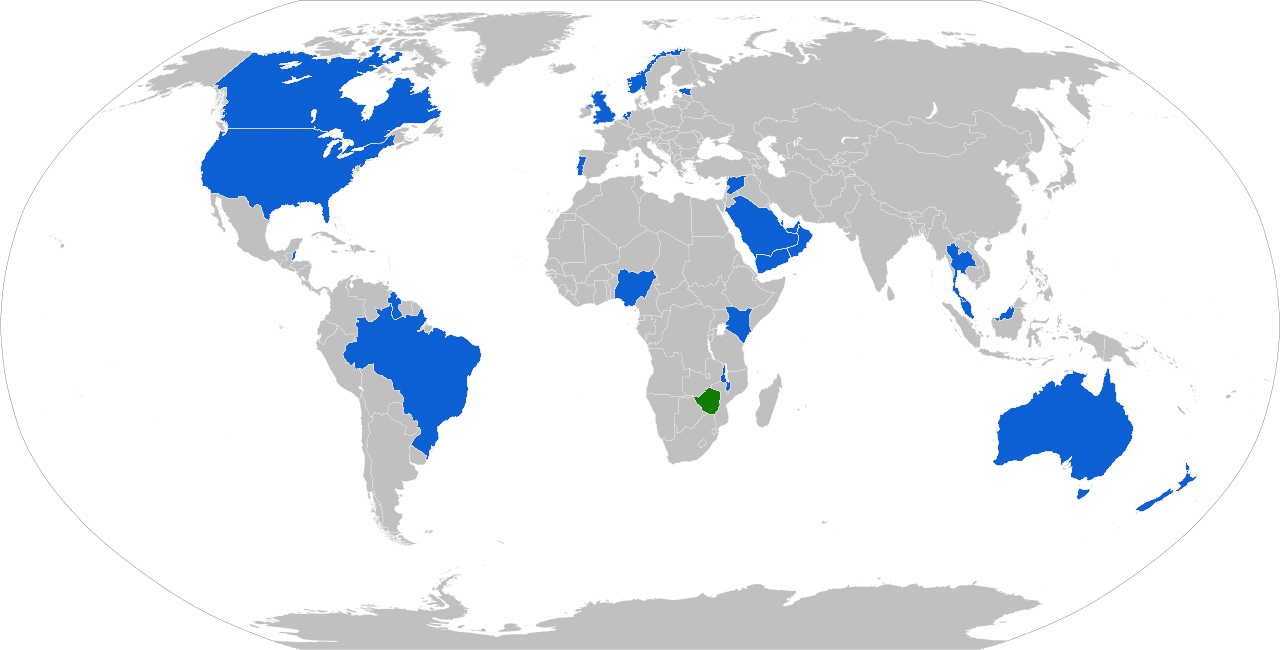
Map with L18 operators in blue.

=== Current operators ===
- Austria: known as 'M8 mortar'
- Belize
- Brazil
- Canada
- Estonia
- Guyana
- India
- Japan
- Kenya
- Malawi
- Malaysia
- Netherlands: L16A2
- New Zealand: L16A2
- Nigeria
- Norway
- Oman
- Portugal
- Qatar
- Saudi Arabia
- Syria
- Thailand
- United Arab Emirates
- United Kingdom
- United States: M252 mortar
- Yemen

=== Former operators ===
- Australia: known as the 'F2 81mm mortar' it was manufactured in Australia, and was replaced by the M252A1
- Rhodesia – Rhodesian Army
- Lebanese Forces (militia)

== Gallery ==
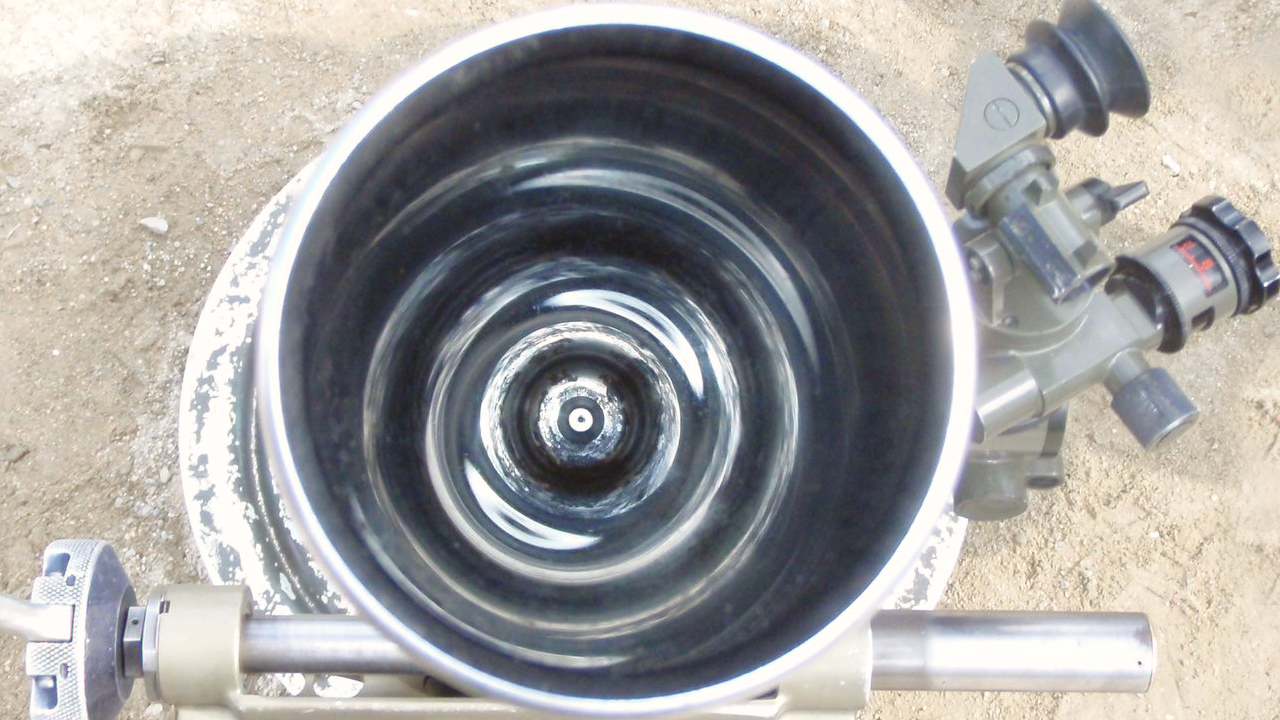
View down the smoothbore barrel of the L16 mortar.

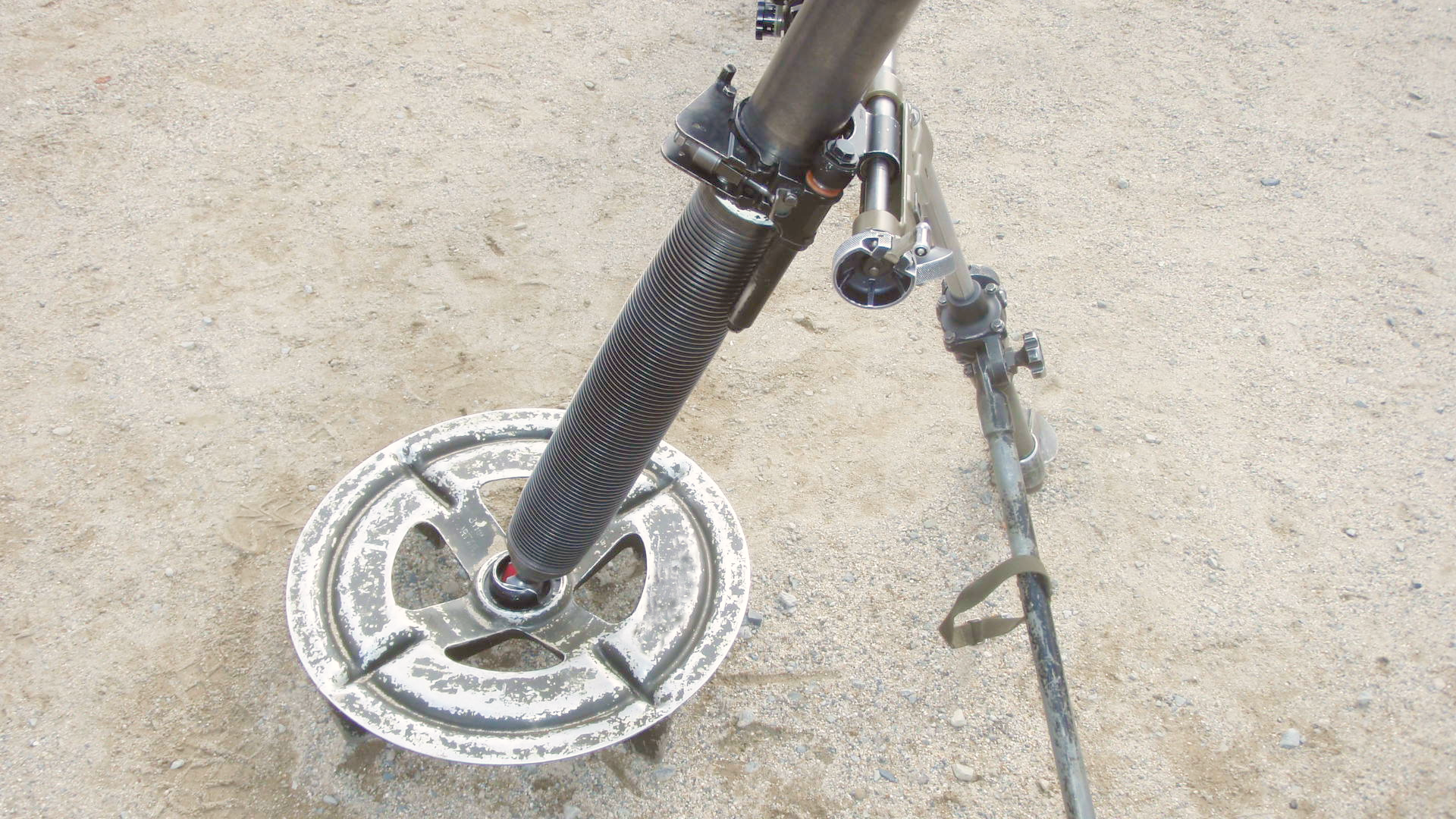
L16 baseplate.

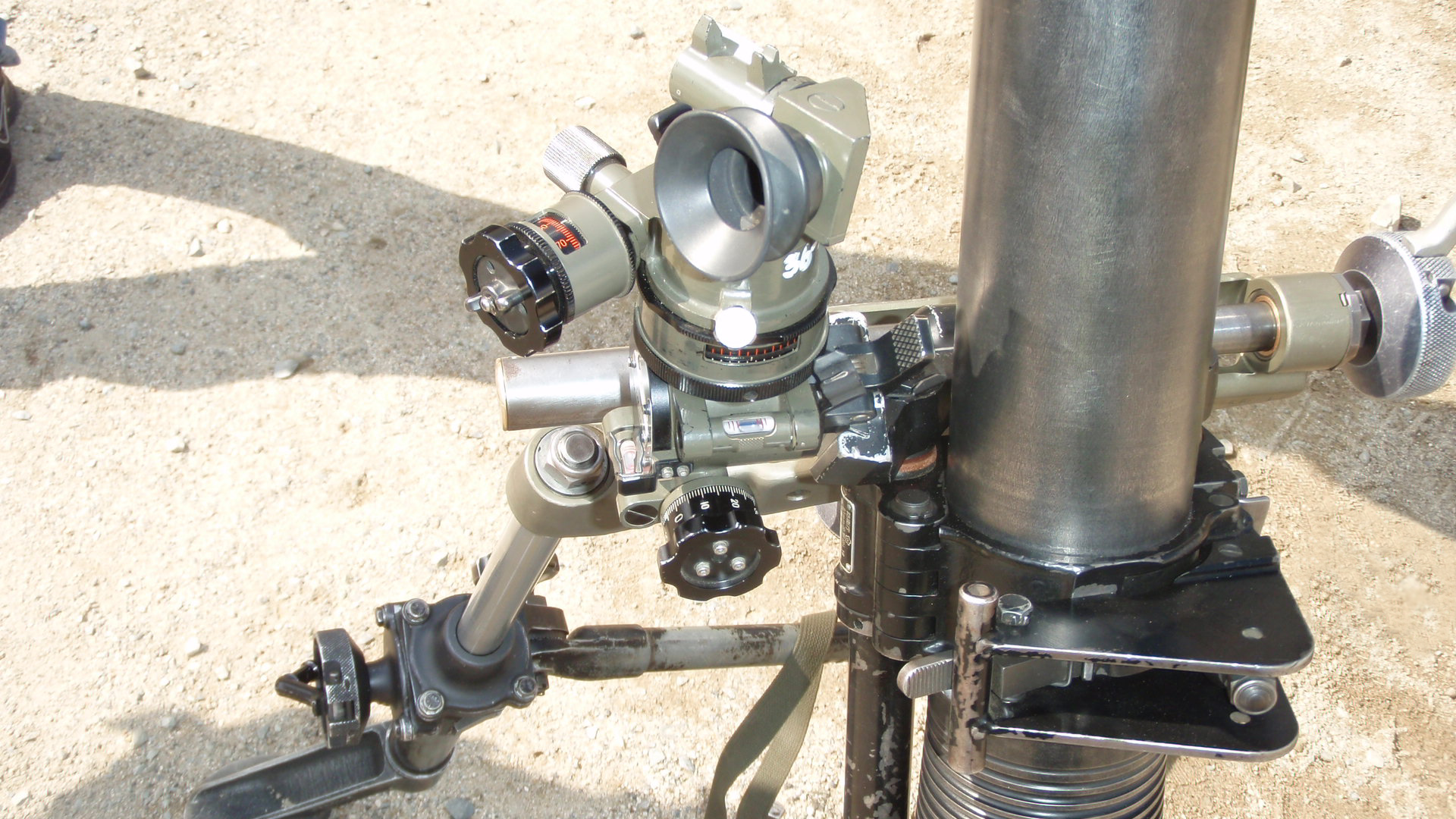
L16 C2 sight.

Video of L16 81mm mortar fired by JGSDF soldiers during Orient Shield 2012
