= M734 fuze =

Rangefinder and collision detection system

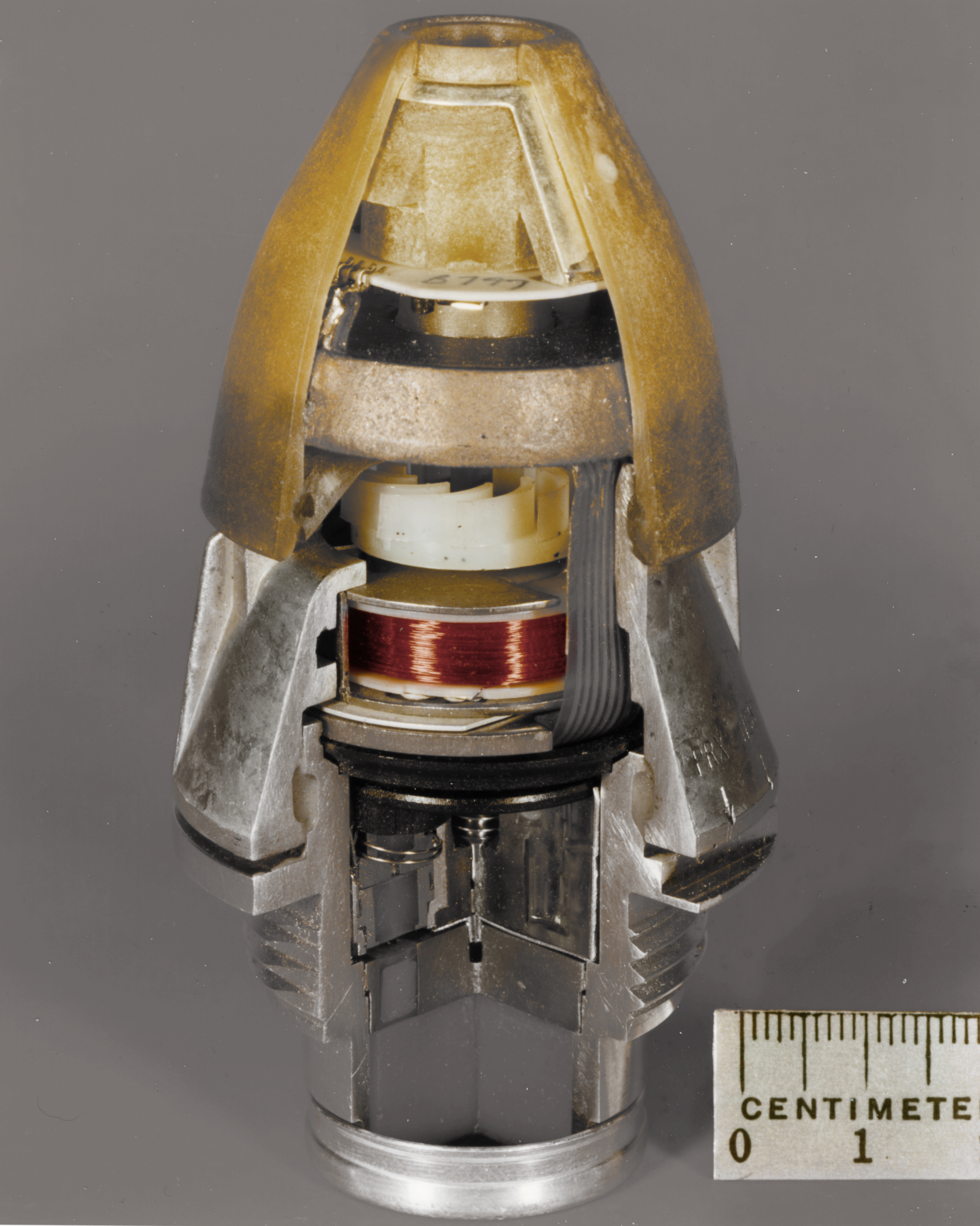
M734 fuze cross section

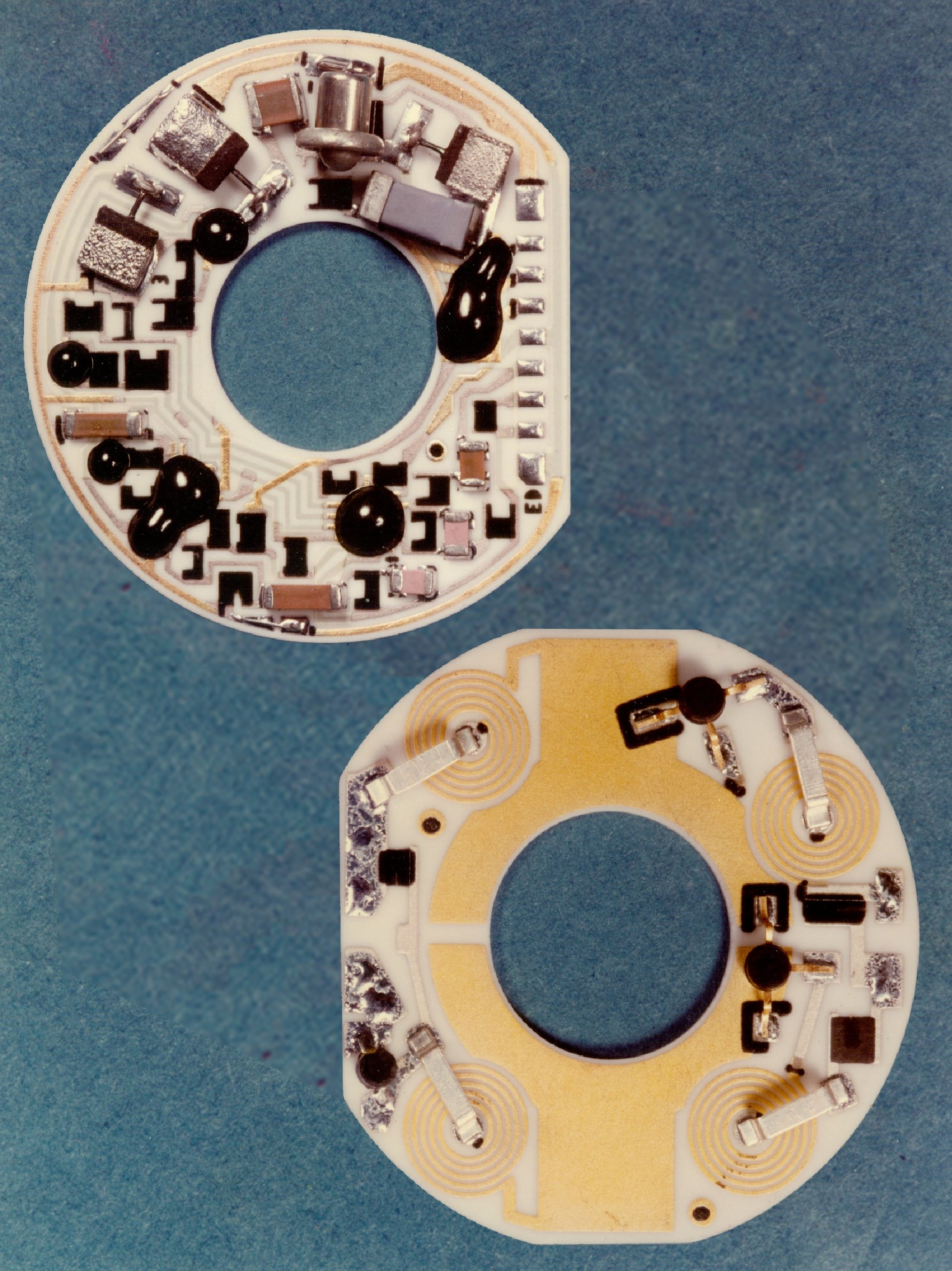
Amplifier (top) and oscillator

The M734 multi-option fuze is a rangefinder and collision detection system used on 60 mm, 81 mm, and 120 mm mortar shells as a trigger to detonate the shells at the most damaging heights of burst when combating four types of battlefield threats:

- The rangefinder is a Doppler radar using frequency-modulated continuous-wave FMCW technology to emit a radar signal and can be set to trigger two types of air-bursts, one being a near surface burst to combat standing targets and the other being a higher proximity burst downward onto prone or dug-in targets.

- The collision detection portion of the fuze consists of two mechanical devices, one being a quick response electric inertial switch for a burst upon impact with a target, such as a vehicle, and the other being a slow response mechanical detonator that allows shell penetration, such as through a forest canopy, before detonating.

This integration of four functions into a single fuze reduces the logistics and cost to support mortar crews on the battlefield.

== Settings ==
A typical mortar firing procedure is for a squad leader to select a target and call for one of the four fuze settings. A gunner sights the mortar onto the target and an ammunition bearer sets the fuze. An assistant gunner drops the shell into the tube upon a command to fire from the squad leader.

Tools are not required to install or set the fuze. It is adjusted by hand, even with Arctic mittens, simply by rotating the top of the fuze clockwise until a three-letter engraving is above an index line. Additionally, the setting can be changed any number of times without causing damage to the fuze. The four engravings around the circumference of metal housing of the fuze have the following meanings for detonation height:

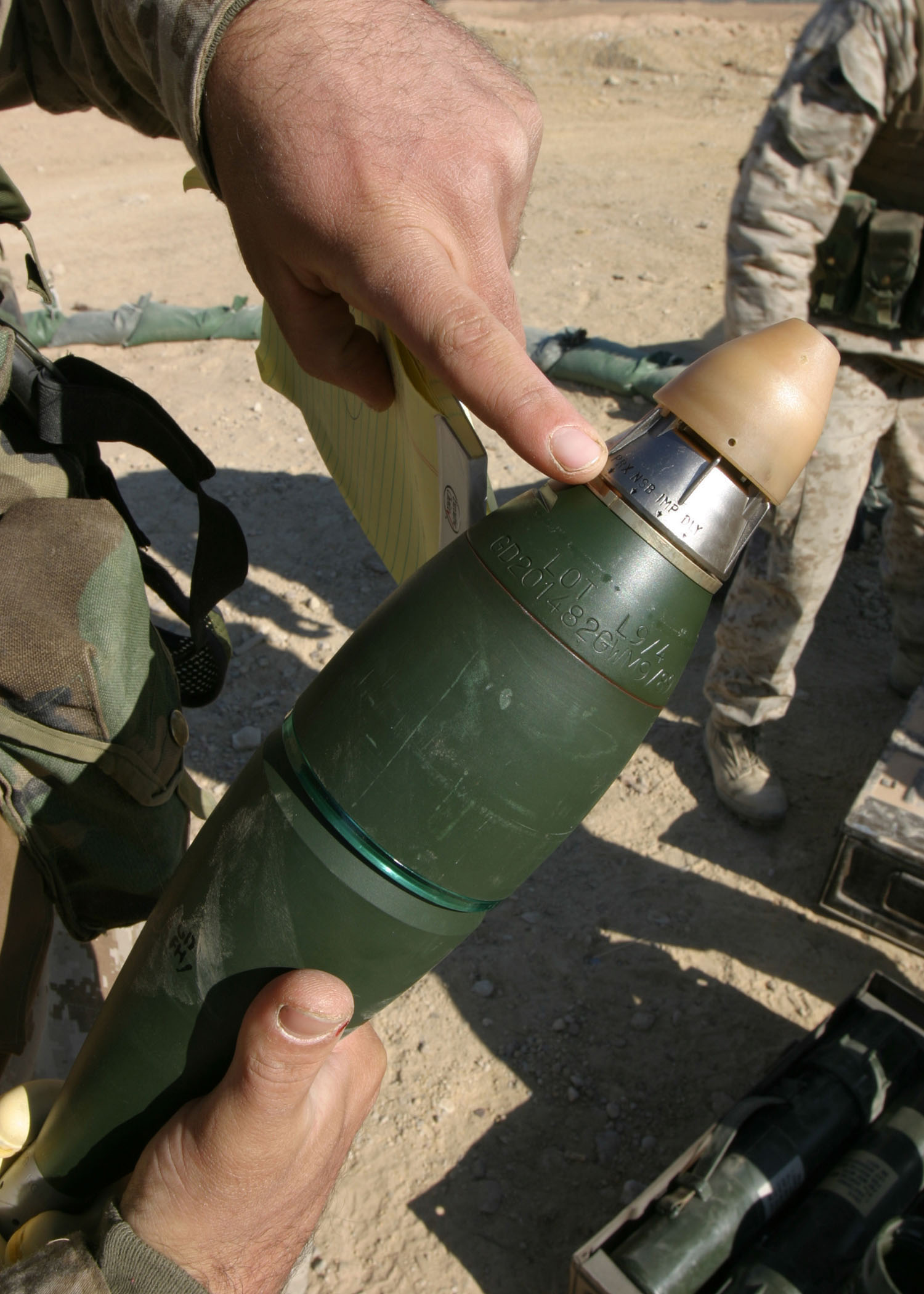
Engravings for fuze settings

- PRX = Proximity air burst between 3 and 13 feet
- NSB = Near surface burst between 0 and 3 feet
- IMP = Impact burst on contact. (In the event an IMP setting fails, detonation is 1/2 second after impact.)
- DLY = Delay after impact of 0.05 seconds in the fuze explosive train before the shell detonates.

In all four settings, the high explosive in the mortar shell is detonated by a cascading explosive train of four increasing energies within the fuze. These are the Microdet electric detonator, the explosive lead, the explosive booster, and the delay primer assembly functioning as follows:

- In the PROX, NSB, and IMP fuze settings, a firing circuit applies a voltage to the small Microdet which faces and ignites a bigger explosive lead that channels into the explosive booster which initiates the shell's high explosive.
- In the DLY setting, the explosive lead is initiated instead by the delay primer assembly, which operates even in the event of power supply or electronics failures.
- Reliability against duds is increased by the fact that if the M734 fails to detonate the mortar shell at one setting, it will immediately and automatically use the next one along, i.e. failure at the PRX setting causes NSB detonation to be selected. Similarly, failure to detonate at the NSB setting will automatically cause IMP to be selected, and so on.
- This redundancy is a safety factor designed to prevent malfunctioning mortar shells from being buried upon ground impact and becoming a risk to civilians after a battle or becoming ammunition for enemy activities.

== Safety ==
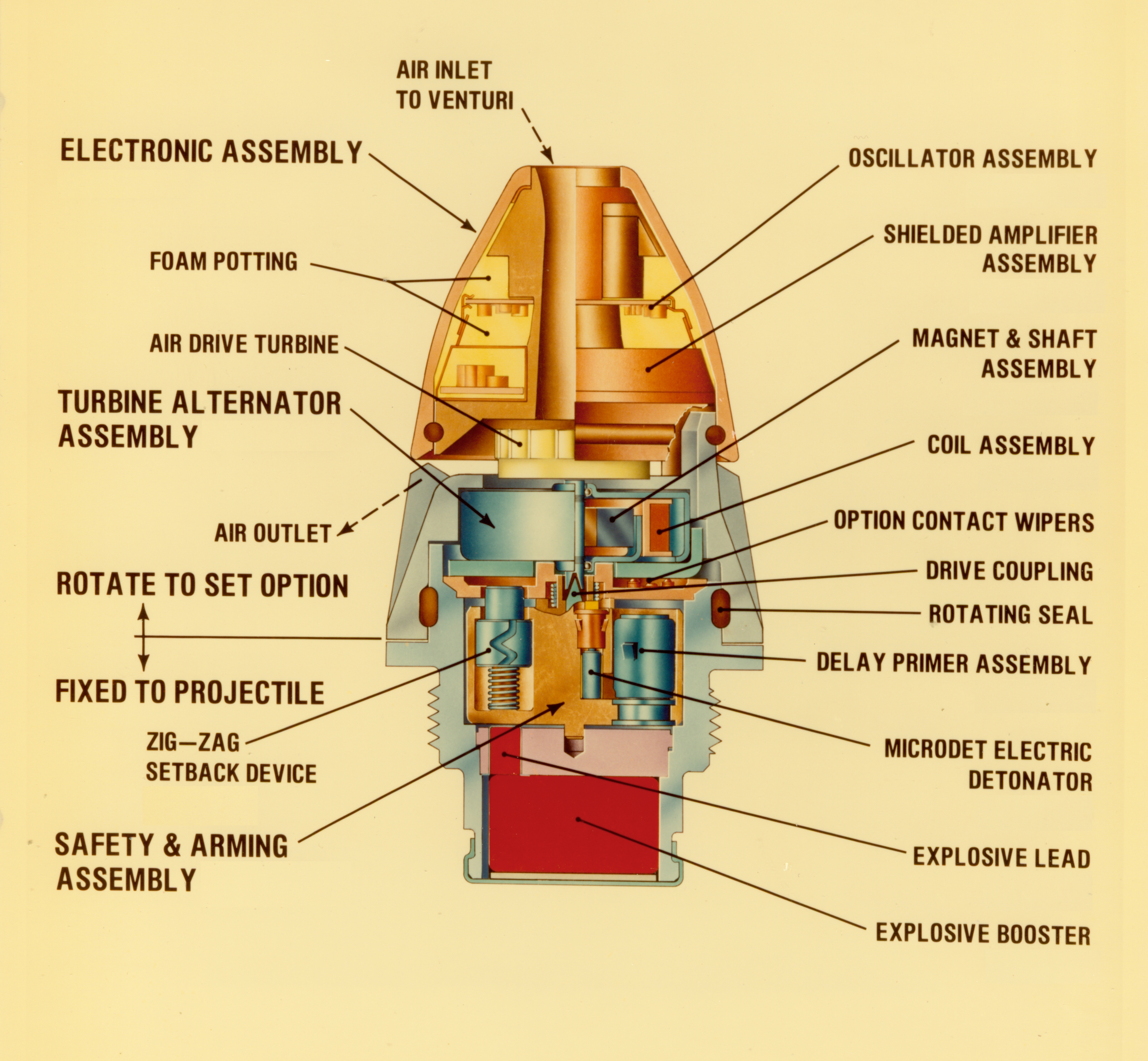
M734 fuze components

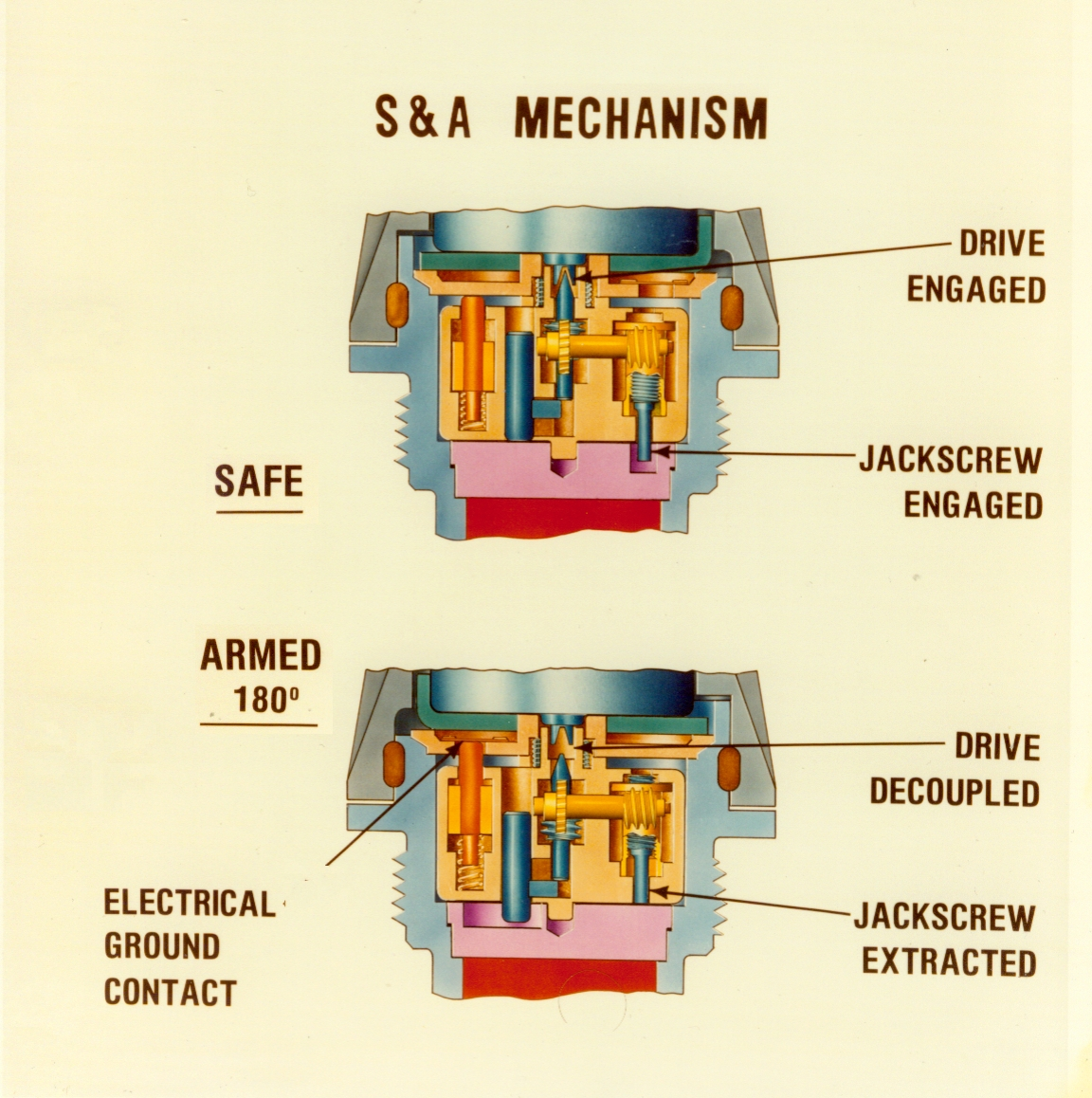
Mechanical arming

Fuzes assembled by the manufacturer are preset to PRX and stockpiled on mortar shells for immediate use. The fuze is safe to handle, however, because the two detonators are mounted in a safety and arming (S&A) assembly that holds them 180 degrees out of alignment with the explosive lead and booster. The events required to rotate the explosive train into alignment and generate power for the fuze electronics cannot be accomplished by accident or deliberately by a vandal because three actions difficult to simulate must be applied in rapid succession:

1. An axial acceleration pulse similar to the launch inside a mortar tube
2. Air flow through the nose cone air-inlet and air-outlet that is similar to flight
3. Motion that resembles the trajectory of a mortar shell in flight (on the product improved M734A1 fuze)

Axial acceleration and wind stream forces combine to arm the fuze 100 meters or more from the launcher. This mechanical arming is accomplished by a torsion spring rotating the detonators 180 degrees into an explosive train alignment as soon as the spring is unlocked by the acceleration forces depressing a zig-zag setback device and the wind stream forces unscrewing a jackscrew locking device.

This delay in mechanical arming after two independent features of gunfire is a basic safety requirement called "dual-safing". An unprecedented third safety factor incorporated as a product improvement in the M734A1 fuze was to delay the electrical arming of the PROX, NSB, and IMP settings beyond 100 meters out to the highest point of shell flight.

- This electrical arming is simply the energizing of the firing circuit to the Microdet used by all three fuze settings
- Since the apex varies with each type of mortar, the firing angle, and the amount of propellant, a microprocessor in the fuze is used to calculate the time remaining after launch to reach peak height. This is accomplished by monitoring in real time the frequencies of the Doppler radar and the wind driven power supply (turbine alternator assembly) and comparing to a data bank in memory.

== Power supply ==
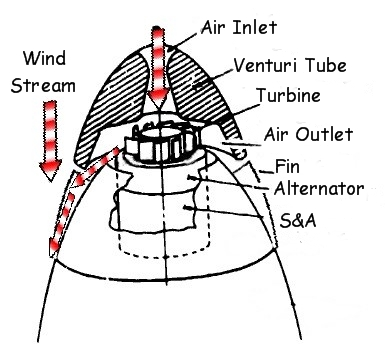
M734 fuze power supply components

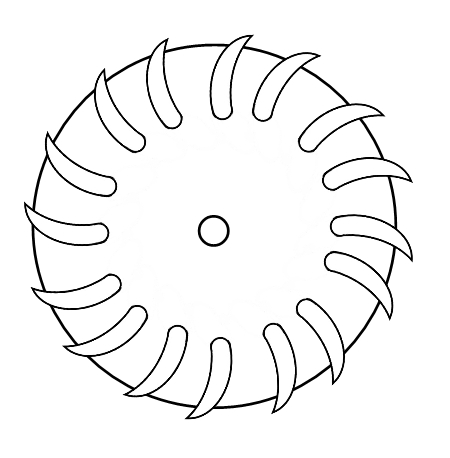
Air turbine

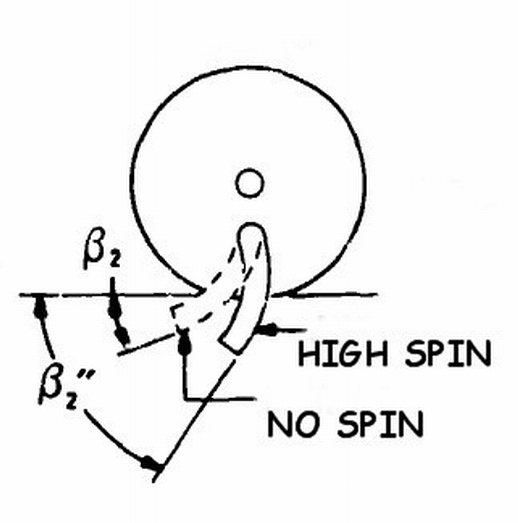
Turbine spin governor

The wind stream in flight provides both the mechanical power needed to arm the S&A and the electrical power needed for the fuze electronics. There is a system of components used in the M734 to capture and regulate air flow within the fuze and convert a portion of the air power to mechanical and electrical power before exiting the fuze.

- In this system, the air inlet directs the wind stream into a converging-diverging nozzle (Venturi tube) that limits the mass flow rate (choked flow)
- The axial flow then rams the center of a flat impeller and flows radially through the blades. The curvature of the blades continuously redirects the flow and the net pressure on the concave surface area generates a torque that rotates a drive shaft.
- The drive shaft is permanently connected to an alternating current generator called the turbine alternator assembly whose operating principles resemble an automobile belt-driven alternator miniaturized to provide 20 volts and withstand an acceleration of 20,000 g.
- The drive shaft is also engaged with the S&A mechanism at the time of launch, and disengages after a specific number of shaft revolutions. This action unscrews a jackscrew locking device and enables the explosive train to snap into alignment, thereby completing the second step in mechanical arming.

Since arming is required to occur after a flight of 100 meters for three mortars that have a wide range in launch velocities, the rpm that releases the jackscrew at the slowest launch velocity must increase in direct proportion to any increase in launch velocity. The turbine, however, will tend to spin faster than desired, so, to prevent early arming, three governors are used to reduce the spin:

- First, the number, size, and curvature of the turbine blades is designed to achieve arming at 100 meters or more for the lowest launch velocity of 45 m/s
- Second, the Venturi tube is designed to limit the mass flow rate of air available to propel the turbine
- Third, the tips of the turbine blades are undercut to introduce a flexibility that allows centrifugal force to bend the tips outward. This decreases the effective blade curvature, which lowers the surface pressure on the blade and the turbine spins slower than with an inflexible blade. By undercutting deep enough, the jackscrew drive shaft rotation is slow enough at all launch velocities to assure arming is beyond the minimum 100 meters.

Once the air flows from the tips, the air outlet directs the exhaust into the atmosphere at an angle oblique to the external wind stream. The resulting turbulence degrades the accuracy of flight toward the target, so the exhaust is directed onto a vertical metal fin that guides the flow into the external wind stream.

The performance of the turbine alternator is unaffected if the mortar shell encounters a tropical rainstorm while en route to the target.

== History ==
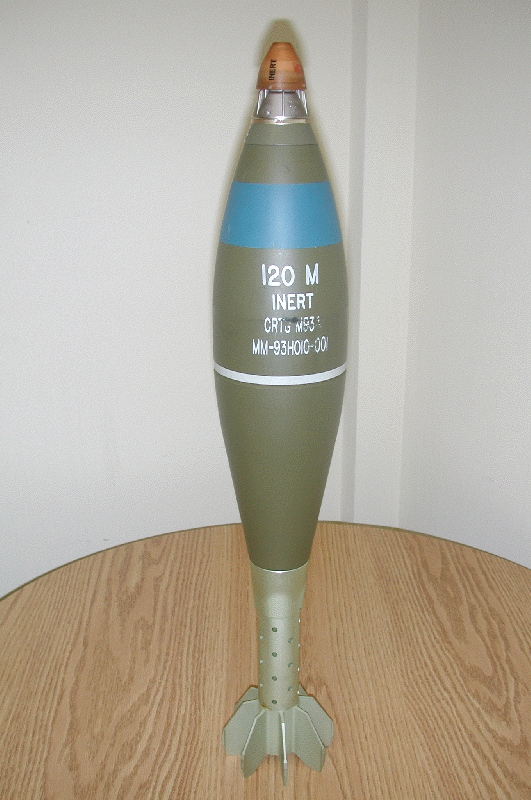
Inert 120 mm mortar and M734 fuze

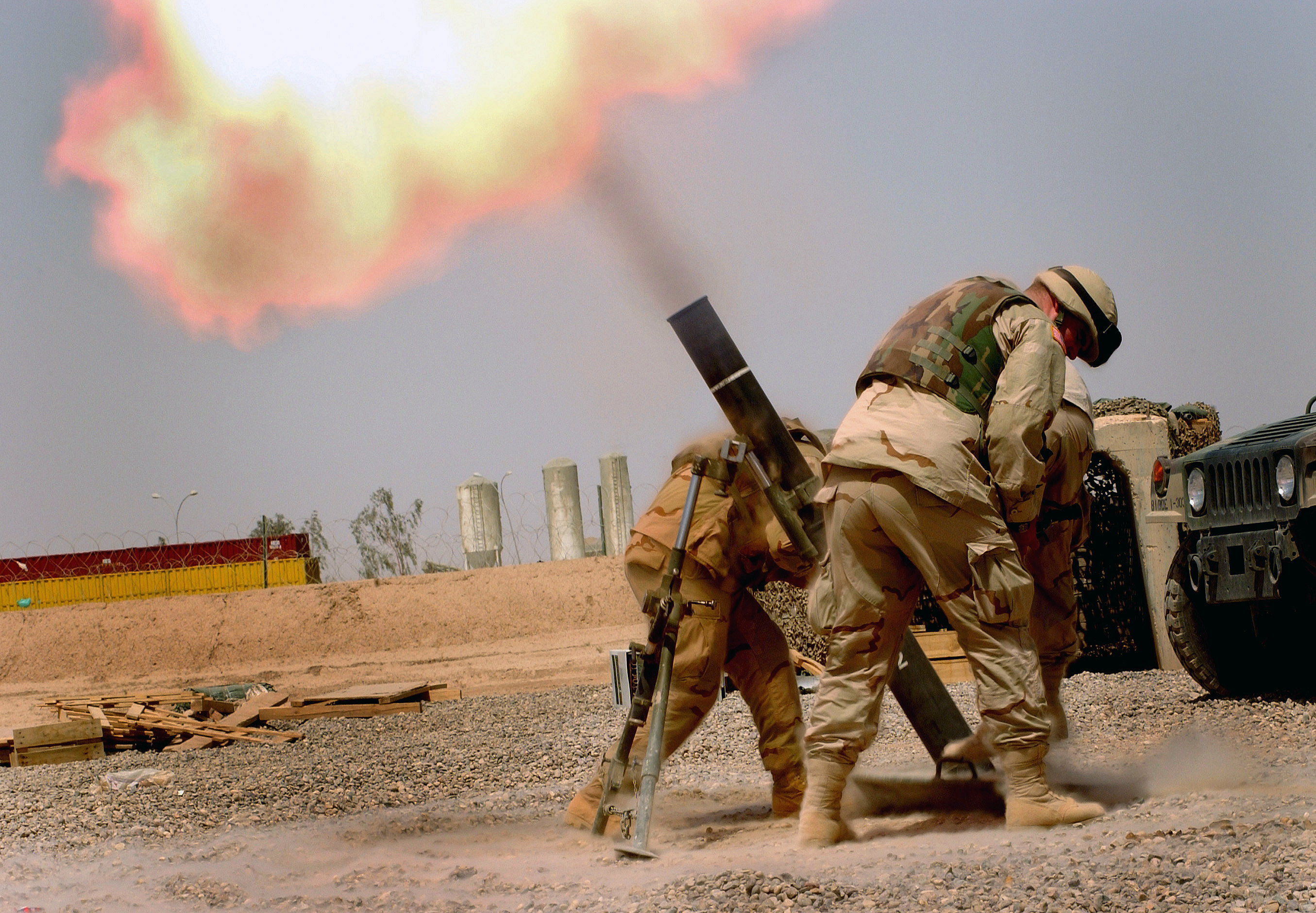
Soldiers firing a 120 mm mortar

The M734 fuze was developed at the Harry Diamond Laboratories (HDL) for the 60 mm lightweight company mortar system, which now is managed by the Armament Research Development and Engineering Center (ARDEC) Fuze Division. It was determined to be suitable for army use in July 1977 and accorded type classification standard. To demonstrate readiness for transition into full rate production by the Armament Munitions and Chemical Command (AMCCOM), ARDEC/HDL managed the first production for war reserves as well as the construction of automated initial production facilities (IPF) for mobilization readiness. HDL awarded three competitive contracts in 1978/79: Eastman Kodak (Rochester, NY) for the fuze assembly and IPF, Motorola (Scottsdale, AZ) for the amplifier assembly and IPF, and Alinabal (Milford, CT.) for the alternator assembly and IPF. After successful first article inspection and production lot acceptance tests, transition was completed in March 1983. AMCCOM performed all procurements for stockpile with technical support by ARDEC. The Army Mortar Plan issued in 1985 expanded use of the M734 fuze to 60 mm, 81 mm, and 120 mm mortars. Improvements in the fuze reliability and performance by ARDEC engineers led to production of the M734A1 fuze manufactured by L-3 FOS (Formerly KDI).

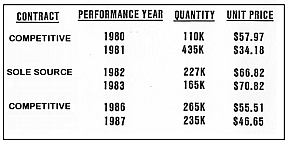
Initial production cost of M734 fuze

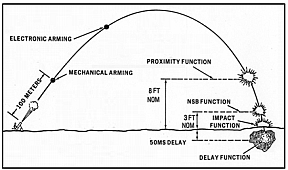
Four optional battlefield settings
